This is a list of the spiders found in India and is based on Siliwal, Molur and Biswas (2005).

I. Family Agelenidae C.L. Koch, 1837
I.a. Genus Agelena Walckenaer, 1805
 Agelena barunae Tikader, 1970 Comments: Endemic to India
 Agelena gautami Tikader, 1962 Comments: Endemic to India
 Agelena inda Simon, 1897 Comments: Endemic to India
 Agelena oaklandensis Barman, 1979 Comments: Endemic to India
 Agelena satmila Tikader, 1970 Comments: Endemic to India
 Agelena shillongensis Tikader, 1969 Comments: Endemic to India
I.b. Genus Tegenaria Latreille, 1804
 Tegenaria comstocki Gajbe, 2004 Comments: Endemic to India
 Tegenaria domestica (Clerck, 1757)
 Tegenaria hemanginiae Reddy & Patel, 1992 Comments: Endemic to India
 Tegenaria shillongensis Barman, 1979 Comments: Endemic to India

II. Family Amaurobiidae Thorell, 1870
II.a. Genus Amaurobius C.L. Koch, 1837
 Amaurobius andhracus Patel & Reddy, 1990 Comments: Endemic to India
 Amaurobius indicus Bastawade, 2002 Comments: Endemic to India. Misplaced ?
 Amaurobius nathabhaii Patel & Patel, 1975 Comments: Endemic to India
II.b.   Genus Tamgrinia Lehtinen, 1967 
 Tamgrinia alveolifera (Schenkel, 1936)

III Family Anyphaenidae Bertkau, 1878
III.a. Genus Anyphaena Sundevall, 1833 
 Anyphaena soricina Simon, 1889 Comments: Endemic to India

IV Family Araneidae Simon, 1895
IV.a. Genus Arachnura Vinson, 1863
 Arachnura angura Tikader, 1970 Comments: Endemic to India
 Arachnura melanura Simon, 1867 Distribution: India to Japan and Sulawesi
IV.b. Genus Araneus Clerck, 1757
 Araneus anantnagensis Tikader & Bal, 1981 Comments: Endemic to India
 Araneus bilunifer Pocock, 1900 Comments: Endemic to India
 Araneus boerneri (Strand, 1907) Comments: Endemic to India
 a. A. boerneri clavimaculus (Strand, 1907) Comments: Endemic to India
 b. A. boerneri obscurellus (Strand, 1907) Comments: Endemic to India
 Araneus camilla (Simon, 1889) Comments: Endemic to India
 Araneus decentellus (Strand, 1907) Distribution: India, China
 Araneus ellipticus (Tikader & Bal, 1981)
 Araneus enucleatus (Karsch, 1879) Distribution: India, Sri Lanka, Myanmar, Sumatra
 Araneus fulvellus (Roewer, 1942) Distribution: India, Pakistan Comments: Endemic to South Asia.
 Araneus himalayaensis Tikader, 1975 Distribution: India, China
 Araneus himalayanus (Simon, 1889) Comments: Endemic to India.
 Araneus hirsutulus (Stoliczka, 1869) Comments: Endemic to India.
 Araneus liber (Leardi, 1902) Endemic to India.
 Araneus minutalis (Simon, 1889) Comments: Endemic to India.
 Araneus mitificus (Simon, 1886) Distribution: India to Philippines, New Guinea
 Araneus noegeatus (Thorell, 1895) Distribution: India, Myanmar, Singapore, Sumatra
 Araneus nympha (Simon, 1889) Distribution: India, Pakistan, China
 Araneus pahalgaonensis Tikader & Bal, 1981 Distribution: India, China
 Araneus panchganiensis Tikader & Bal, 1981 Comments: Endemic to India.
 Araneus sponsus (Thorell, 1887) Comments: Endemic to India.
 Araneus viridisomus (Gravely, 1921) Comments: Endemic to India.
IV.c. Genus Araniella Chamberlin & Ivie, 1942
 Araniella cucurbitina (Clerck, 1757) Distribution: Palearctic
IV.d. Genus Argiope Audouin, 1826 
 Argiope aemula (Walckenaer, 1842) Distribution: India to Philippines, New Hebrides
 Argiope anasuja Thorell, 1887 Distribution: Pakistan to Maldives Comments: Endemic to South Asia
 Argiope caesarea Thorell, 1897 Distribution: India, Myanmar, China
 Argiope catenulata (Doleschall, 1859) Distribution: India to Philippines, New Guinea
 Argiope macrochoera Thorell, 1891 Distribution: India, China
 Argiope minuta Karsch, 1879 Distribution: India, Bangladesh, East Asia
 Argiope pulchella Thorell, 1881 Distribution: India to China and Java
 Argiope lobata (Pallas, 1772) Distribution: Old World
 Argiope trifasciata (Forskål, 1775) Distribution: Cosmopolitan
IV.e. Genus Cercidia Thorell, 1869 
 Cercidia punctigera Simon, 1889 Comments: Endemic to India.
IV.f. Genus Chorizopes O.P.-Cambridge, 1870
 Chorizopes anjanes Tikader, 1965 Comments: Endemic to India.
 Chorizopes bengalensis Tikader, 1975 Distribution: India, China
 Chorizopes calciope (Simon, 1895) Comments: Endemic to India.
 Chorizopes congener O.P.-Cambridge, 1885 Comments: Endemic to India.
 Chorizopes khandaricus Gajbe nom. nov. Comments: Endemic to India.
 Chorizopes kastoni Gajbe & Gajbe, 2004 Comments: Endemic to India.
 Chorizopes khanjanes Tikader, 1965 Distribution: India, China
 Chorizopes khedaensis Reddy & Patel, 1993 Comments: Endemic to India.
 Chorizopes pateli Reddy & Patel, 1993 Comments: Endemic to India.
 Chorizopes stoliczkae O.P.-Cambridge, 1885 Comments: Endemic to India.
 Chorizopes tikaderi Sadana & Kaur, 1974 Comments: Endemic to India.
IV.g. Genus Cyclosa Menge, 1866
 Cyclosa albisternis Simon, 1887 Distribution: India, Hawaii
 Cyclosa bifida (Doleschall, 1859) Distribution: India to Philippines, New Guinea
 Cyclosa centrodes (Thorell, 1887) Distribution: India to Singapore
 Cyclosa confraga (Thorell, 1892) Distribution: India, Bangladesh to Malaysia
 Cyclosa hexatuberculata Tikader, 1982 Comments: Endemic to India
 Cyclosa insulana (Costa, 1834) Distribution: Mediterranean to Philippines, Australia
 Cyclosa micula (Thorell, 1892) Distribution: India, Singapore
 Cyclosa moonduensis Tikader, 1963 Comments: Endemic to India
 Cyclosa mulmeinensis (Thorell, 1887) Distribution: Africa to Japan, Philippines
 Cyclosa neilensis Tikader, 1977 Comment: Endemic to Andaman & Nicobar Islands
 Cyclosa oatesi (Thorell, 1892) Comments: Endemic to Andaman & Nicobar Islands
 Cyclosa quinqueguttata (Thorell, 1881) Distribution: India, Bhutan, Myanmar, China, Taiwan
 Cyclosa simoni Tikader, 1982 Comments: Endemic to India
 Cyclosa spirifera Simon, 1889 Comments: Endemic to India
 Cyclosa tuberascens Simon, 1906 Comments: Endemic to India
IV.h. Genus Cyrtarachne Thorell, 1868
 Cyrtarachne avimerdaria Tikader, 1963 Comments: Endemic to India
 Cyrtarachne bengalensis Tikader, 1961 Distribution: India, China
 Cyrtarachne biswamoyi Tikader, 1961 Comments: Endemic to India
 Cyrtarachne gravelyi Tikader, 1961 Comments: Endemic to India
 Cyrtarachne inaequalis Thorell, 1895 Distribution: India to Japan
 Cyrtarachne invenusta Thorell, 1891 Comments: Endemic to Andaman & Nicobar Islands
 Cyrtarachne promilai Tikader, 1963 Comments: Endemic to India
 Cyrtarachne raniceps Pocock, 1900 Distribution: India, Sri Lanka Comments: Endemic to South Asia
 Cyrtarachne schmidi Tikader, 1963 Comments: Endemic to India
 Cyrtarachne sundari Tikader, 1963 Comments: Endemic to India
IV.i. Genus Cyrtophora Simon, 1864
 Cyrtophora bidenta Tikader, 1970 Comments: Endemic to India
 Cyrtophora cicatrosa (Stoliczka, 1869) Distribution: Pakistan to New Guinea
 Cyrtophora citricola (Forskål, 1775) Distribution: Old World, Hispaniola, Colombia
 Cyrtophora feai (Thorell, 1887) Distribution: India to Myanmar
 Cyrtophora jabalpurensis Gajbe & Gajbe, 1999 Comments: Endemic to India
 Cyrtophora ksudra Sherriffs, 1928 Comments: Endemic to India
 Cyrtophora moluccensis (Doleschall, 1857) Distribution: India to Japan, Australia
IV.j. Genus Eriovixia Archer, 1951
 Eriovixia excelsa (Simon, 1889) Distribution: India, Pakistan, Philippines, Indonesia, Taiwan
 Eriovixia laglaizei (Simon, 1877) Distribution: India, China to Philippines, New Guinea
 Eriovixia poonaensis (Tikader & Bal, 1981) Distribution: India, China
IV.k. Genus Gasteracantha Sundevall, 1833 
 Gasteracantha cancriformis (Linnaeus, 1758)
 Gasteracantha cuspidata C. L. Koch, 1837 Distribution: India, Malaysia, Java

 Gasteracantha dalyi Pocock, 1900 Distribution: India, Pakistan Comments: Endemic to South Asia
 Gasteracantha diadesmia Thorell, 1887 Distribution: India to Philippines
 Gasteracantha frontata Blackwall, 1864 Distribution: India, Myanmar, Thailand, Flores, Borneo
 Gasteracantha geminata (Fabricius, 1798) Distribution: India, Sri Lanka Comments: Endemic to South Asia
 Gasteracantha hasselti C.L. Koch, 1837 Distribution: India, China to Moluccas
 Gasteracantha kuhli C.L. Koch, 1837 Distribution: India to Japan, Philippines

 Gasteracantha remifera Butler, 1873 Distribution: India, Sri Lanka Comments: Endemic to South Asia
 Gasteracantha sororna Butler, 1873 Comments: Endemic to India
 Gasteracantha taeniata (Walckenaer, 1842) Distribution: India to Polynesia
 Gasteracantha unguifera Simon, 1889 Comments: Endemic to India
IV.l. Genus Gea C.L. Koch, 1843
 Gea spinipes C.L. Koch, 1843 Distribution: India, China, Taiwan to Borneo
 Gea subarmata Thorell, 1890 Distribution: India, Bangladesh to Philippines, New Guinea
IV.m. Genus Gibbaranea Archer, 1951
 Gibbaranea bituberculata (Walckenaer, 1802) Distribution: Palearctic
IV.n. Genus Larinia Simon, 1874
 Larinia bharatae Bhandari & Gajbe, 2001 Comments: Endemic to India
 Larinia chloris (Audouin, 1826) Distribution: India, Middle East to Mozambique
 Larinia emertoni Gajbe & Gajbe, 2004 Comments: Endemic to India
 Larinia jaysankari Biswas, 1984 Comments: Endemic to India
 Larinia kanpurae Patel & Nigam, 1994 Comments: Endemic to India
 Larinia phthisica (L. Koch, 1871) Distribution: Asia, Japan, Philippines, Australia
 Larinia tyloridia Patel, 1975 Comments: Endemic to India
IV.o. Genus Lipocrea Thorell, 1878
 Lipocrea fusiformis (Thorell, 1877) Distribution: India to Japan, Philippines, Sulawesi
IV.p. Genus Macracantha Simon, 1864 Comments: It is a monotypic Genus 
 Macracantha arcuata (Fabricius, 1793) Distribution: India, China to Borneo
IV.q. Genus Neogea Levi, 1983
 Neogea nocticolor (Thorell, 1887) Distribution: India to Sumatra
IV.r. Genus Neoscona Simon, 1864
 Neoscona achine (Simon, 1906) Distribution: India, China
 Neoscona bihumpi Patel, 1988 Comments: Endemic to India
 Neoscona bengalensis Tikader & Bal, 1981 Comments: Endemic to India
 Neoscona biswasi Bhandari & Gajbe, 2001 Comments: Endemic to India
 Neoscona chrysanthusi Tikader & Bal, 1981 Distribution: Bhutan, India Comments:Endemic to South Asia
 Neoscona dhruvai Patel & Nigam, 1994 Comments: Endemic to India
 Neoscona dhumani Patel & Reddy, 1993 Comments: Endemic to India
 Neoscona dyali Gajbe, 2004 Comments: Endemic to India
 Neoscona molemensis Tikader & Bal, 1981 Distribution: Bangladesh, India to Philippines, Indonesia
 Neoscona mukerjei Tikader, 1980 Comments: Endemic to India
 Neoscona murthyi Patel & Reddy, 1990 Comments: Endemic to India
 Neoscona nautica (L. Koch, 1875) Distribution: Cosmotropical
 Neoscona odites (Simon, 1906) Comments: Endemic to India.
 Neoscona parambikulamensis Patel, 2003 Comments: Endemic to India
 Neoscona pavida (Simon, 1906) Distribution: India, China
 Neoscona platnicki Gajbe & Gajbe, 2001 Comments: Endemic to India
 Neoscona punctigera (Doleschall, 1857) Distribution: Réunion to Japan
 Neoscona raydakensis Saha et al., 1995 Comments: Endemic to India
 Neoscona sanghi Gajbe, 2004 Comments: Endemic to India
 Neoscona shillongensis Tikader & Bal, 1981 Distribution: India, China
 Neoscona sinhagadensis (Tikader, 1975) Distribution: India, China
 Neoscona theisi (Walckenaer, 1842) Distribution: India, China to Pacific Island
 Neoscona triangula (Keyserling, 1864) Distribution: Cape Verde to India
 Neoscona ujavalai Reddy & Patel, 1992 Comments: Endemic to India
 Neoscona vigilans (Blackwall, 1865) Distribution: Africa to Philippines, New Guinea
IV.s. Genus Ordgarius Keyserling, 1886
 Ordgarius hexapinus Saha & Raychaudhuri, 2004 Comments: Endemic to India
 Ordgarius hobsoni (O. P.-Cambridge, 1877) Distribution: India, Sri Lanka, China, Japan
 Ordgarius sexspinosus (Thorell, 1894) Distribution: India to Japan, Indonesia
IV.t. Genus Parawixia F.O.P.-Cambridge, 1904 
 Parawixia dehaanii (Doleschall, 1859) Distribution: India to Philippines, New Guinea
IV.u. Genus Pasilobus Simon, 1895 
 Pasilobus kotigeharus Tikader, 1963 Comments: Endemic to India
IV.v.   Genus Poltys C.L. Koch, 1843
 Poltys bhabanii (Tikader, 1970) Comments: Endemic to India.
 Poltys bhavnagarensis Patel, 1988 Comments: Endemic to India
 Poltys illepidus C. L. Koch, 1843 Distribution: India to Philippines, Australia
 Poltys nagpurensis Tikader, 1982 Comments: Endemic to India
 Poltys pogonias Thorell, 1891 Comments: Endemic to Andaman and Nicobar Islands
IV.w. Genus Prasonica Simon, 1895 
 Prasonica insolens (Simon, 1909) Distribution: India, Vietnam, Java
IV.x. Genus Singa C. L. Koch, 1836
 Singa haddooensis Tikader, 1977 Comments: Endemic to Andaman & Nicobar Islands
 Singa chota Tikader, 1970 Comments: Endemic to India
 Singa myrrhea (Simon, 1895) Comments: Endemic to India.
IV.y.  Genus Thelacantha Hasselt, 1882 Comments: It is a monotypic genus.
 Thelacantha brevispina (Doleschall, 1857) Distribution: India to Philippines, Madagascar, Australia
IV.z. Genus Zilla C. L. Koch, 1834
 Zilla globosa Saha & Raychaudhuri, 2004 Comments: Endemic to India
IV.aa. Genus Zygiella F.O.P.-Cambridge, 1902
 Zygiella indica Tikader & Bal, 1980 Comments: Endemic to India
 Zygiella shivui Patel & Reddy, 1990 Comments: Endemic to India

V Family Atypidae Thorell, 1870
V.a. Genus Atypus Latreille, 1804 
 Atypus sutherlandi Chennappaiya, 1935 Comments: Endemic to India

VI Family Barychelidae Simon, 1889
VI.a. Genus Diplothele O. P.-Cambridge, 1890 Comments: Endemic to South Asia
 Diplothele walshi O. P.-Cambridge, 1890 Comments: Endemic to India
VI.b. Genus Sason Simon, 1887
 Sason andamanicum Simon, 1888 Comments: Endemic Andaman & Nicobar Islands
 Sason robustum (O. P.-Cambridge, 1883) Distribution: India, Sri Lanka, Seychelles
VI.c. Genus Sasonichus Pocock, 1900 Comments: Monotypic Genus and endemic to India.
 Sasonichus sullivani Pocock, 1900 Comments: Endemic to India
VI.d. Genus Sipalolasma Simon, 1892 
. Sipalolasma arthrapophysis (Gravely, 1915) Comments: Endemic to India.

VII Family Cithaeronidae Simon, 1893
VII.a. Genus Cithaeron O. P.-Cambridge, 1872 
 Cithaeron indicus Platnick & Gajbe, 1994 Comments: Endemic to India
VII.b. Genus Inthaeron Platnick, 1991 Comments: Monotypic Genus and endemic to India.
 Inthaeron rossi Platnick, 1991 Comments: Endemic to India

VIII Family Clubionidae Wagner, 1887
VIII.a. Genus Clubiona Latreille, 1804
 Clubiona acanthocnemis Simon, 1906 Comments: Endemic to India
 Clubiona analis Thorell, 1895 Distribution: India, Bangladesh, Myanmar
 Clubiona bengalensis Biswas, 1984 Comments: Endemic to India
 Clubiona boxaensis Biswas & Biswas, 1992 Comments: Endemic to India
 Clubiona chakrabartei Majumder & Tikader, 1991 Comments: Endemic to India.
 Clubiona crouxi Caporiacco, 1935 Comments: Endemic to India
 Clubiona deletrix O. P.-Cambridge, 1885 Distribution: India, China, Taiwan, Japan
 Clubiona drassodes O. P.-Cambridge, 1874 Distribution: India, Bangladesh, China
 Clubiona filicata O. P.-Cambridge, 1874 Distribution: India, Bangladesh, China
 Clubiona hysgina Simon, 1889 Comments: Endemic to India
 Clubiona ludhianaensis Tikader, 1976 Distribution: India, Bangladesh Comments: Endemic to South Asia
 Clubiona nicobarensis Tikader, 1977 Comments: Endemic to Andaman & Nocobar Islands
 Clubiona nilgherina Simon, 1906 Comments: Endemic to India
 Clubiona pashabhaii Patel & Patel, 1973 Comments: Endemic to India
 Clubiona pogonias Simon, 1906 Comments: Endemic to India
 Clubiona shillongensis Majumder & Tikader, 1991 Comments: Endemic to India
 Clubiona submaculata (Thorell, 1891) Comments: Endemic to Andaman & Nicobar Islands.
 Clubiona tikaderi Majumder & Tikader, 1991 Comments: Endemic to India.
VIII.b. Genus Matidia Thorell, 1878 
 Matidia incurvata Reimoser, 1934 Comments: Endemic to India
VIII.c. Genus Simalio Simon, 1897
 Simalio aurobindoi Patel & Reddy, 1991 Comments: Endemic to India
 Simalio biswasi Majumder & Tikader, 1991 Comments: Endemic to India
 Simalio castaneiceps Simon, 1906 Comments: Endemic to India
 Simalio percomis Simon, 1906 Comments: Endemic to India

IX. Family Corinnidae Karsch, 1880
IX.a. Genus Aetius O.P.-Cambridge, 1896 
 Aetius decollatus O.P.-Cambridge, 1896 Distribution: India, Sri Lanka Comments: Endemic to South Asia
IX.b. Genus Apochinomma Pavesi, 1881
 Apochinomma dolosum Simon, 1897 Comments: Endemic to India.
 Apochinomma nitidum (Thorell, 1895) Distribution: India, Myanmar, Thailand, Borneo, Sulawesi
IX.c. Genus Castianeira Keyserling, 1879
 Castianeira adhartali Gajbe, 2003 Comments: Endemic to India
 Castianeira albopicta Gravely, 1931 Comments: Endemic to India.
 Castianeira bengalensis Biswas, 1984 Comments: Endemic to India.
 Castianeira flavipes Gravely, 1931 Comments: Endemic to India
 Castianeira himalayensis Gravely, 1931 Comments: Endemic to India.
 Castianeira indica Tikader, 1981 Comments: Endemic to India.
 Castianeira quadrimaculata Reimoser, 1934 Comments: Endemic to India.
 Castianeira tinae Patel & Patel, 1973 Distribution: India, China
 Castianeira zetes Simon, 1897 Distribution: India, Bangladesh, Comments: Endemic to South Asia.
IX.d. Genus Coenoptychus Simon, 1885 Comments: Monotypic Genus endemic to South Asia.
 Coenoptychus pulcher Simon, 1885 Distribution: India, Sri Lanka Comments: Endemic to South Asia
IX.e. Genus Corinnomma Karsch, 1880 
 Corinnomma comulatum Thorell, 1891 Comments: Endemic to Andaman & Nicobar Islands
 Corinnomma rufofuscum Reimoser, 1934 Comments: Endemic to India
 Corinnomma severum (Thorell, 1877) Distribution: India to China, Philippines, Sulawesi
IX.f. Genus Creugas Thorell, 1878 
 Creugas gulosus (Thorell, 1878) Distribution: Cosmopolitan
IX.g. Genus Oedignatha Thorell, 1881
 Oedignatha albofasciata Strand, 1907 Comments: Endemic to India
 Oedignatha andamanensis (Tikader, 1977) Comments: Endemic to Andaman & Nicobar Islands.
 Oedignatha binoyii Reddy & Patel, 1993 Comments: Endemic to India
 Oedignatha carli Reimoser, 1934 Comments: Endemic to India
 Oedignatha dentifera Reimoser, 1934 Comments: Endemic to India
 Oedignatha escheri Reimoser, 1934 Comments: Endemic to India
 Oedignatha indica Reddy & Patel, 1993 Comments: Endemic to India
 Oedignatha lesserti Reimoser, 1934 Comments: Endemic to India
 Oedignatha microscutata Reimoser, 1934 Comments: Endemic to India
 Oedignatha poonaensis Majumder & Tikader, 1991 Comments: Endemic to India
 Oedignatha procerula Simon, 1897 Comments: Endemic to India.
 Oedignatha scrobiculata Thorell, 1881 Distribution: India to Philippines
 Oedignatha shillongensis Biswas & Majumder, 1995 Comments: Endemic to India
 Oedignatha tricuspidata Reimoser, 1934 Comments: Endemic to India
 Oedignatha uncata Reimoser, 1934 Comments: Endemic to India
IX.h. Genus Trachelas L. Koch, 1872
 Trachelas himalayensis Biswas, 1993 Comments: Endemic to India
 Trachelas oreophilus Simon, 1906 Distribution: India, Sri Lanka Comments: Endemic to South Asia
IX.i. Genus Utivarachna Kishida, 1940 
 Utivarachna fronto (Simon, 1906) Comments: Endemic to India.

X Family Cryptothelidae L. Koch, 1872
X.a. Genus Cryptothele L. Koch, 1872 
 Cryptothele collina Pocock, 1901 Comments: Endemic to India

XI Family Ctenidae Keyserling, 1877
XI.a. Genus Acantheis Thorell, 1891 
 Acantheis indicus Gravely, 1931 Comments: Endemic to India
XI.b. Genus Ctenus Walckenaer, 1805
 Ctenus andamanensis Gravely, 1931 Comments: Endemic to India
 Ctenus bomdilaensis Tikader & Malhotra, 1981 Comments: Endemic to India
 Ctenus cochinensis Gravely, 1931 Comments: Endemic to India
 Ctenus corniger F. O. P.-Cambridge, 1898 Comments: Endemic to India
 Ctenus dangsus Reddy & Patel, 1994 Comments: Endemic to India
 Ctenus himalayensis Gravely, 1931 Comments: Endemic to India
 Ctenus indicus Gravely, 1931 Comments: Endemic to India
 Ctenus kapuri Tikader, 1973 Comments: Endemic to Andaman & Nicobar Isles
 Ctenus meghalayaensis Tikader, 1976 Comments: Endemic to India
 Ctenus narashinhai Patel & Reddy, 1988 Comments: Endemic to India
 Ctenus sikkimensis Gravely, 1931 Comments: Endemic to India
 Ctenus smythiesi Simon, 1897 Comments: Endemic to India
 Ctenus tuniensis Patel & Reddy, 1988 Comments: Endemic to India

XII Family Ctenizidae Thorell, 1887
XII.a. Genus Latouchia Pocock, 1901 
 Latouchia cryptica (Simon, 1897) Comments: Endemic to India.

XIII Family Deinopidae C. L. Koch, 1850
XIII.a. Genus Deinopis MacLeay, 1839
 Deinopis goalparaensis Tikader & Malhotra, 1978 Comments: Endemic to India

XIV Family Desidae Pocock, 1895
XIV.a. Genus Desis Walckenaer, 1837 
 Desis gardineri Pocock, 1904 Comments: Endemic to Laccadive Island
 Desis inermis Gravely, 1927 Comments: Endemic to India

XV Family Dictynidae O.P.-cambridge, 1871
XV.a. Genus Ajmonia Caporiacco, 1934 
 Ajmonia velifera (Simon, 1906) Distribution: India to China
XV.b. Genus Anaxibia Thorell, 1898 
 Anaxibia rebai (Tikader, 1966) Comments: Endemic to India.
XV.c. Genus Argenna Thorell, 1870
 Argenna patula (Simon, 1874) Distribution: Palearctic
XV.d. Genus Dictyna Sundevall, 1833 
 Dictyna albida O. P.-Cambridge, 1885 Distribution: India, China
 Dictyna turbida Simon, 1905 Distribution: India, Sri Lanka Comments: Endemic to South Asia.
 Dictyna umai Tikader, 1966 Comments: Endemic to India.
XV.e. Genus Dictynomorpha Spassky, 1939
 Dictynomorpha bedeshai (Tikader, 1966) Comments: Endemic to India.
 Dictynomorpha marakata (Sherriffs, 1927) Comments: Endemic to India.
XV.f. Genus Lathys Simon, 1884
 Lathys stigmatisata (Menge, 1869) Distribution: Palearctic
XV.g. Genus Nigma Lehtinen, 1967 
 Nigma shiprai (Tikader, 1966) Comments: Endemic to India.
XV.h. Genus Sudesna Lehtinen, 1967 
 Sudesna grossa (Simon, 1906) Comments: Endemic to India.

XVI. Family Dipluridae Simon, 1889
XVI.a. Genus Indothele Coyle, 1995 Comments: Endemic to South Asia.
 Indothele dumicola (Pocock, 1900)
 Indothele mala Coyle, 1995 Comments: Endemic to India
 Indothele rothi Coyle, 1995 Comments: Endemic to India
XVI.b. Genus Ischnothele Ausserer, 1875 
 Ischnothele indicola Tikader, 1969 Comments: Endemic to India.

XVII Family Eresidae C.L. Koch, 1851
XVII.a. Genus Stegodyphus Simon, 1873
 Stegodyphus mirandus Pocock, 1899 Comments: Endemic to India
 Stegodyphus pacificus Pocock, 1900 Distribution: India, Iran, Pakistan
 Stegodyphus sarasinorum Karsch, 1891 Distribution: India, Sri Lanka, Nepal Comments: Endemic to South Asia
 Stegodyphus tibialis (O.P.-Cambridge, 1869) Distribution: India, Myanmar, Thailand

XVIII Family Filistatidae Ausserer, 1867
XVIII.a. Genus Filistata Latreille, 1810
 Filistata chiardolae Caporiacco, 1934 Comments: Endemic to India.
 Filistata napadensis Patel, 1975 Comments: Endemic to India.
 Filistata rufa Caporiacco, 1934 Comments: Endemic to India.
 Filistata seclusa O.P.-Cambridge, 1885 Distribution: India, China
XVIII.b. Genus Pritha Lehtinen, 1967
 Pritha dharmakumarsinhjii Patel, 1978 Comments: Endemic to India
 Pritha insularis (Thorell, 1881) Comments: Endemic to Andaman & Nicobar Islands.
 Pritha nicobarensis (Tikader, 1977) Comments: Endemic to Andaman & Nicobar Islands.
 Pritha poonaensis (Tikader, 1963) Comments: Endemic to India.
XVIII.c. Genus Sahastata Benoit, 1968
 Sahastata ashapuriae Patel, 1978 Comments: Endemic to India
 Sahastata nigra (Simon, 1897) Distribution: Mediterranean to India

XIX Family Gnaphosidae Pocock, 1898
XIX.a. Genus Apodrassodes Vellard, 1924 
 Apodrassodes yogeshi Gajbe, 1993 Comments: Endemic to India.
XIX.b. Genus Callilepis Westring, 1874 
 Callilepis chakanensis Tikader, 1982 Comments: Endemic to India
 Callilepis ketani Gajbe, 1984 Comments: Endemic to India
 Callilepis lambai Tikader & Gajbe, 1977 Comments: Endemic to India
 Callilepis pawani Gajbe, 1984 Comments: Endemic to India
 Callilepis rajani Gajbe, 1984 Comments: Endemic to India
 Callilepis rajasthanica Tikader & Gajbe, 1977 Comments: Endemic to India
 Callilepis rukminiae Tikader & Gajbe, 1977 Comments: Endemic to India
XIX.c. Genus Camillina Berland, 1919 
 Camillina smythiesi (Simon, 1897)
XIX.d. Genus Drassodes Westring, 1851 
 Drassodes andamanensis Tikader, 1977 Comments: Endemic Andaman & Nicobar Islands
 Drassodes astrologus (O.P.-Cambridge, 1874) Comments: Endemic to India
 Drassodes cambridgei Roewer, 1951 Comments: Endemic to India.
 Drassodes carinivulvus Caporiacco, 1934 Comments: Endemic to India
 Drassodes cerinus Simon, 1897 Comments: Endemic to India
 Drassodes delicatus (Blackwall, 1867) Comments: Endemic to India
 Drassodes deoprayagensis Tikader & Gajbe, 1975 Comments: Endemic to India
 Drassodes gangeticus Tikader & Gajbe, 1975 Comments: Endemic to India
 Drassodes gujaratensis Patel & Patel, 1975 Comments: Endemic to India
 Drassodes heterophthalmus Simon, 1905 Comments: Endemic to India
 Drassodes himalayensis Tikader & Gajbe, 1975 Comments: Endemic to India.
 Drassodes luridus (O.P.-Cambridge, 1874) Comments: Endemic to India
 Drassodes macilentus (O.P.-Cambridge, 1874) Comments: Endemic to India
 Drassodes maindroni Simon, 1897 Distribution: Oman, India
 Drassodes meghalayaensis Tikader & Gajbe, 1977 Comments: Endemic to India
 Drassodes parvidens Caporiacco, 1934 Distribution: India, Pakistan Comments:Endemic to South Asia
 Drassodes pashanensis Tikader & Gajbe, 1977 Distribution: India, China
 Drassodes rubicundulus Caporiacco, 1934 Distribution: India, Pakistan Comments: Endemic to South Asia
 Drassodes sagarensis Tikader, 1982 Comments: Endemic to India
 Drassodes singulariformis Roewer, 1951 Comments: Endemic to India.
 Drassodes sirmourensis (Tikader & Gajbe, 1977) Distribution: India, China
 Drassodes sitae Tikader & Gajbe, 1975 Comments: Endemic to India.
 Drassodes tikaderi (Gajbe, 1987) Comments: Endemic to India.
 Drassodes villosus (Thorell, 1856) Distribution: Palearctic
 Drassodes viveki (Gajbe, 1992) Comments: Endemic to India.
XIX.e. Genus Drassyllus Chamberlin, 1922
 Drassyllus khajuriai Tikader & Gajbe, 1976 Comments: Endemic to India
 Drassyllus mahabalei Tikader, 1982 Comments: Endemic to India
 Drassyllus platnicki Gajbe, 1987 Comments: Endemic to India
 Drassyllus ratnagiriensis Tikader & Gajbe, 1976 Comments: Endemic to India
XIX.f. Genus Echemus Simon, 1878 
 Echemus chaperi Simon, 1885 Comments: Endemic to India
 Echemus viveki Gajbe, 1989 Comments: Endemic to India
XIX.g. Genus Eilica Keyserling, 1891
 Eilica kandarpae Nigam & Patel, 1996 Comments: Endemic to India
 Eilica platnicki Tikader & Gajbe, 1977 Comments: Endemic to India
 Eilica songadhensis Patel, 1988 Comments: Endemic to India
 Eilica tikaderi Platnick, 1976 Comments: Endemic to India
XIX.h. Genus Gnaphosa Latreille, 1804
 Gnaphosa jodhpurensis Tikader & Gajbe, 1977 Comments: Endemic to India
 Gnaphosa kailana Tikader, 1966 Comments: Endemic to India
 Gnaphosa pauriensis Tikader & Gajbe, 1977 Comments: Endemic to India
 Gnaphosa poonaensis Tikader, 1973 Comments: Endemic to India
 Gnaphosa rohtakensis Gajbe, 1992 Comments: Endemic to India
 Gnaphosa stoliczkai O.P.-Cambridge, 1885 Distribution: India, China
XIX.i. Genus Haplodrassus Chamberlin, 1922
 Haplodrassus ambalaensis Gajbe, 1992 Comments: Endemic to India
 Haplodrassus bengalensis Gajbe, 1992 Comments: Endemic to India
 Haplodrassus chotanagpurensis Gajbe, 1987 Comments: Endemic to India
 Haplodrassus dumdumensis Tikader, 1982 Comments: Endemic to India
 Haplodrassus jacobi Gajbe, 1992 Comments: Endemic to India
 Haplodrassus morosus (O. P.-Cambridge, 1872) Distribution: India, Israel
 Haplodrassus sataraensis Tikader & Gajbe, 1977 Comments: Endemic to India
 Haplodrassus tehriensis Tikader & Gajbe, 1977 Comments: Endemic to India
XIX.j. Genus Herpyllus Hentz, 1832
 Herpyllus calcuttaensis Biswas, 1984 Comments: Endemic to India
 Herpyllus goaensis Tikader, 1982 Comments: Endemic to India
XIX.k. Genus Ladissa Simon, 1907
 Ladissa inda (Simon, 1897) Comments: Endemic to India
 Ladissa latecingulata Simon, 1907 Comments: Endemic to India
XIX.l. Genus Megamyrmaekion Wider, 1834
 Megamyrmaekion ashae Tikader & Gajbe, 1977 Comments: Endemic to India
 Megamyrmaekion jodhpurense Gajbe, 1993 Comments: Endemic to India
 Megamyrmaekion kajalae Biswas & Biswas, 1992 Comments: Endemic to India.
XIX.m. Genus Micaria Westring, 1851 
 Micaria faltana Bhattacharya, 1935 Comments: Endemic to India
XIX.n. Genus Nodocion Chamberlin, 1922 
 Nodocion solanensis Tikader & Gajbe, 1977 Comments: Endemic to India
 Nodocion tikaderi (Gajbe, 1992) Comments: Endemic to India.
XIX.o. Genus Nomisia Dalmas, 1921 
 Nomisia harpax (O.P.-Cambridge, 1874) Comments: Endemic to India.
XIX.p. Genus Odontodrassus Jézéquel, 1965 
 Odontodrassus mundulus (O. P.-Cambridge, 1872) Distribution: India, Tunisia to Israel
XIX.q. Genus Phaeocedus Simon, 1893
 Phaeocedus haribhaiius Patel & Patel, 1975 Comments: Endemic to India
 Phaeocedus nicobarensis Tikader, 1977 Comments: Endemic to Andaman & Nicobar Islands
 Phaeocedus poonaensis Tikader, 1982 Comments: Endemic to India
XIX.r. Genus Poecilochroa Westring, 1874
 Poecilochroa barmani Tikader, 1982 Comments: Endemic to India
 Poecilochroa behni Thorell, 1891 Comments: Endemic to Andaman & Nicobar Islands
 Poecilochroa devendrai Gajbe & Rane, 1985 Comments: Endemic to India
 Poecilochroa sedula (Simon, 1897) Comments: Endemic to India
 Poecilochroa tikaderi Patel, 1989 Comments: Endemic to India
XIX.s. Genus Pterotricha Kulczyn’ski, 1903 
 Pterotricha tikaderi Gajbe, 1983 Comments: Endemic to India
XIX.t. Genus Scopoides Platnick, 1989
 Scopoides kuljitae (Tikader, 1982) Comments: Endemic to India.
 Scopoides maitraiae (Tikader & Gajbe, 1977) Comments: Endemic to India.
 Scopoides pritiae (Tikader, 1982) Comments: Endemic to India.
 Scopoides tikaderi (Gajbe, 1987) Comments: Endemic to India.
XIX.u. Genus Scotophaeus Simon, 1893
 Scotophaeus bharatae Gajbe, 1989 Comments: Endemic to India
 Scotophaeus blackwalli (Thorell, 1871) Distribution: Cosmopolitan
 Scotophaeus domesticus Tikader, 1962 Distribution: India, China
 Scotophaeus kalimpongensis Gajbe, 1992 Comments: Endemic to India
 Scotophaeus madalasae Tikader & Gajbe, 1977 Comments: Endemic to India
 Scotophaeus merkaricola Strand, 1907 Comments: Endemic to India
 Scotophaeus nigrosegmentatus (Simon, 1895) Distribution: India, Mongolia
 Scotophaeus poonaensis Tikader, 1982 Comments: Endemic to India
 Scotophaeus rajasthanus Tikader, 1966 Comments: Endemic to India
 Scotophaeus simlaensis Tikader, 1982 Comments: Endemic to India
XIX.v. Genus Sergiolus Simon, 1891 
 Sergiolus khodiarae Patel, 1988 Comments: Endemic to India
 Sergiolus lamhetaghatensis Gajbe & Gajbe, 1999 Comments: Endemic to India
 Sergiolus meghalayensis Tikader & Gajbe, 1976 Comments: Endemic to India
 Sergiolus poonaensis Tikader & Gajbe, 1976 Comments: Endemic to India
 Sergiolus singhi Tikader & Gajbe, 1976  Comments: Endemic to India
XIX.w. Genus Setaphis Simon, 1893
 Setaphis browni (Tucker, 1923) Distribution: India, Central, South Africa to Pakistan
 Setaphis subtilis (Simon, 1897) Distribution: West, South Africa to Philippines
XIX.x. Genus Sosticus Chamberlin, 1922 
 Sosticus dherikanalensis Gajbe, 1979 Comments: Endemic to India
 Sosticus jabalpurensis Bhandari & Gajbe, 2001 Comments: Endemic to India
 Sosticus nainitalensis Gajbe, 1979 Comments: Endemic to India
 Sosticus pawani Gajbe, 1993 Comments: Endemic to India
 Sosticus poonaensis Tikader, 1982 Comments: Endemic to India
 Sosticus solanensis Gajbe, 1979 Comments: Endemic to India
 Sosticus sundargarhensis Gajbe, 1979 Comments: Endemic to India
XIX.y. Genus Talanites Simon, 1893 
 Talanites tibialis Caporiacco, 1934 Distribution: India, Pakistan Comments: Endemic to South Asia
XIX.z. Genus Trachyzelotes Lohmander, 1944 
 Trachyzelotes jaxartensis (Kroneberg, 1875) Distribution: Holarctic, Senegal, South Africa, Hawaii
XIX.aa. Genus Urozelotes Mello-Leitão, 1938
 Urozelotes rusticus (L. Koch, 1872) Distribution: Cosmopolitan
XIX.ab. Genus Zelotes Gistel, 1848 
 Zelotes ashae Tikader & Gajbe, 1976 Comments: Endemic to India
 Zelotes baltoroi Caporiacco, 1934 Comments: Endemic to India.
 Zelotes chandosiensis Tikader & Gajbe, 1976 Comments: Endemic to India
 Zelotes choubeyi Tikader & Gajbe, 1979 Comments: Endemic to India
 Zelotes desioi Caporiacco, 1934 Comments: Endemic to India
 Zelotes hospitus (Simon, 1897) Comments: Endemic to India
 Zelotes jabalpurensis Tikader & Gajbe, 1976 Comments: Endemic to India
 Zelotes kusumae Tikader, 1982 Comments: Endemic to India
 Zelotes maindroni (Simon, 1905) Comments: Endemic to India
 Zelotes mandae Tikader & Gajbe, 1979 Comments: Endemic to India
 Zelotes mandlaensis Tikader & Gajbe, 1976 Comments: Endemic to India
 Zelotes nainitalensis Tikader & Gajbe, 1976 Comments: Endemic to India
 Zelotes naliniae Tikader & Gajbe, 1979 Comments: Endemic to India
 Zelotes nasikensis Tikader & Gajbe, 1976 Comments: Endemic to India
 Zelotes nilgirinus Reimoser, 1934 Comments: Endemic to India
 Zelotes pexus (Simon, 1885) Comments: Endemic to India
 Zelotes poonaensis Tikader & Gajbe, 1976 Comments: Endemic to India
 Zelotes pseudopusillus Caporiacco, 1934 Comments: Endemic to India
 Zelotes sajali Tikader & Gajbe, 1979 Comments: Endemic to India
 Zelotes sataraensis Tikader & Gajbe, 1979 Comments: Endemic to India
 Zelotes shantae Tikader, 1982 Comments: Endemic to India
 Zelotes sindi Caporiacco, 1934 Comments: Endemic to India
 Zelotes surekhae Tikader & Gajbe, 1976 Comments: Endemic to India
 Zelotes univittatus (Simon, 1897) Comments: Endemic to India

XX. Family Hahniidae Bertkau, 1878
XX.a. Genus Hahnia C.L. Koch, 1841 
 Hahnia mridulae Tikader, 1970 Comments: Endemic to India
XX.b. Genus Neoantistea Gertsch, 1934
 Neoantistea caporiaccoi Brignoli, 1976 Comments: Endemic to India
 Neoantistea maxima (Caporiacco, 1935)  Comments: Endemic to India.
XX.c. Genus Scotospilus Simon, 1886 
 Scotospilus maindroni (Simon, 1906) Comments: Endemic to India.

XXI Family Hersiliidae Thorell, 1870

XXI.a. Genus Hersilia Audouin, 1826
 Hersilia savignyi Lucas, 1836 Distribution: Sri Lanka, India to Philippines
 Hersilia sumatrana (Thorell, 1890) Distribution: India, Malaysia, Sumatra, Borneo
 Hersilia tibialis Baehr & Baehr, 1993 Distribution: India, Sri Lanka Comments: Endemic to South Asia.
XXI.b. Genus Murricia Simon, 1882
 Murricia triangularis Baehr & Baehr, 1993 Comments: Endemic to India
XXI.c. Genus Neotama Baehr & Baehr, 1993
 Neotama punctigera Baehr & Baehr, 1993 Comments: Endemic to India
 Neotama rothorum Baehr & Baehr, 1993 Comments: Endemic to India

XXII Family Hexathelidae Simon, 1892
XXII.a. Genus Macrothele Ausserer, 1871 
 Macrothele vidua Simon, 1906 Comments: Endemic to India

XXIII Family Homalonychidae Simon, 1893
XXIII.a. Genus Homalonychus Marx, 1891 
 Homalonychus raghavai Patel & Reddy, 1991 Comments: Endemic to India.

XXIV Family Idiopidae Simon, 1892

XXIV.a. Genus Heligmomerus Simon, 1892 
 Heligmomerus prostans Simon, 1892 Comments: Endemic to India
XXIV.b. Genus Idiops Perty, 1833
 Idiops barkudensis (Gravely, 1921) Comments: Endemic to India
 Idiops biharicus Gravely, 1915 Comments: Endemic to India
 Idiops bombayensis nom. nov. Comments: Endemic to India.
 Idiops constructor (Pocock, 1900) Comments: Endemic to India
 Idiops designatus O.P.-Cambridge, 1885 Comments: Endemic to India
 Idiops fortis (Pocock, 1900) Comments: Endemic to India
 Idiops fossor (Pocock, 1900) Comments: Endemic to India
 Idiops garoensis (Tikader, 1977) Comments: Endemic to India
 Idiops madrasensis (Tikader, 1977) Comments: Endemic to India
XXIV.c. Genus Scalidognathus Karsch, 1891 
 Scalidognathus montanus (Pocock, 1900) Comments: Endemic to India

XXV. Family Linyphiidae Blackwall, 1859
XXV.a. Genus Collinsia O. P.-Cambridge, 1913 
 Collinsia crassipalpis (Caporiacco, 1935) Comments: Endemic to India
XXV.b. Genus Cresmatoneta Simon, 1929 
 Cresmatoneta leucophthalma (Fage, 1946) Comments: Endemic to India
XXV.c. Genus Emenista Simon, 1894 
 Emenista bisinuosa Simon, 1894 Comments: Endemic to India
XXV.d. Genus Erigone Audouin, 1826 
 Erigone rohtangensis Tikader, 1981 Comments: Endemic to India
XXV.e. Genus Gongylidiellum Simon, 1884 
 Gongylidiellum confusum Thaler, 1987 Comments: Endemic to India
XXV.f. Genus Heterolinyphia Wunderlich, 1973 Comments: This Genus is endemic to South Asia.
 Heterolinyphia tarakotensis Wunderlich, 1973 Distribution: India, Nepal Comments: Endemic to South Asia
XXV.g. Genus Himalaphantes Tanasevitch, 1992 
 Himalaphantes martensi (Thaler, 1987) Distribution: India, Nepal Comments: Endemic to South Asia.
XXV.h. Genus Indophantes Saaristo & Tanasevitch, 2003
 Indophantes bengalensis Saaristo & Tanasevitch, 2003 Comments: Endemic to India
 Indophantes digitulus (Thaler, 1987) Distribution: India, Nepal Comments: Endemic to South Asia.
 Indophantes pallidus Saaristo & Tanasevitch, 2003 Comments: Endemic to India
XXV.i. Genus Labulla Simon, 1884 
 Labulla nepula Tikader, 1970 Comments: Endemic to India.
XXV.j. Genus Lepthyphantes Menge, 1866
 Lepthyphantes bhudbari Tikader, 1970 Comments: Endemic to India
 Lepthyphantes lingsoka Tikader, 1970 Comments: Endemic to India
 Lepthyphantes rudrai Tikader, 1970 Comments: Endemic to India
XXV.k. Genus Linyphia Latreille, 1804
 Linyphia nicobarensis Tikader, 1977 Comments: Endemic to Andaman & Nicobar Islands
 Linyphia perampla O.P.-Cambridge, 1885 Comments: Endemic to India
 Linyphia sikkimensis Tikader, 1970 Comments: Endemic to India
 Linyphia straminea O.P.-Cambridge, 1885 Comments: Endemic to India
 Linyphia urbasae Tikader, 1970 Comments: Endemic to India
XXV.l. Genus Minicia Thorell, 1875 
 Minicia vittata Caporiacco, 1935 Comments: Endemic to India
XXV.m. Genus Neriene Blackwall, 1833 
 Neriene birmanica (Thorell, 1887) Distribution: India, Myanmar, China
XXV.n. Genus Oedothorax Bertkau, in Förster & Bertkau, 1883
 Oedothorax caporiaccoi Roewer, 1942 Comments: Endemic to India.
 Oedothorax globiceps Thaler, 1987 Comments: Endemic to India
XXV.o. Genus Troxochrota Kulczyn’ski, 1894 
 Troxochrota kashmirica (Caporiacco, 1935) Comments: Endemic to India.

XXVI Family Liocranidae Simon, 1897
XXVI.a. Genus Sphingius Thorell, 1890 
 Sphingius barkudensis Gravely, 1931 Distribution: Bangladesh, India Comments: Endemic to South Asia
 Sphingius bilineatus Simon, 1906 Comments: Endemic to India
 Sphingius caniceps Simon, 1906 Comments: Endemic to India
 Sphingius kambakamensis Gravely, 1931 Comments: Endemic to India
 Sphingius longipes Gravely, 1931 Comments: Endemic to India
 Sphingius nilgiriensis Gravely, 1931 Comments: Endemic to India
 Sphingius paltaensis Biswas & Biswas, 1992 Comments: Endemic to India

XXVII Family Lycosidae Sundevall, 1833
XXVII.a. Genus Agalenocosa Mello-Leitão, 1944 
 Agalenocosa subinermis (Simon, 1897) Comments: Endemic to India.
XXVII.b. Genus Arctosa C.L. Koch, 1847
 Arctosa himalayensis Tikader & Malhotra, 1980 Comments: Endemic to India
 Arctosa indica Tikader & Malhotra, 1980 Distribution: India, China
 Arctosa khudiensis (Sinha, 1951) Distribution: India, China
 Arctosa lesserti Reimoser, 1934 Comments: Endemic to India
 Arctosa mulani (Dyal, 1935) Distribution: India, Pakistan Comments: Endemic to South Asia.
 Arctosa sandeshkhaliensis Majumder, 2004 Comments: Endemic to India
 Arctosa tappaensis Gajbe, 2004 Comments: Endemic to India
XXVII.c. Genus Crocodilosa Caporiacco, 1947
 Crocodilosa leucostigma (Simon, 1885) Comments: Endemic to India.
 Crocodilosa maindroni (Simon, 1897) Comments: Endemic to India
XXVII.d. Genus Evippa Simon, 1882
 Evippa banarensis Tikader & Malhotra, 1980 Comments: Endemic to India
 Evippa jabalpurensis Gajbe, 2004 Comments: Endemic to India
 Evippa mandlaensis Gajbe, 2004 Comments: Endemic to India
 Evippa praelongipes (O.P.-Cambridge, 1870) Distribution: Egypt to India, Pakistan, Kazakhstan
 Evippa rajasthanea Tikader & Malhotra, 1980 Comments: Endemic to India
 Evippa rubiginosa Simon, 1885 Comments: Endemic to India
 Evippa shivajii Tikader & Malhotra, 1980 Comments: Endemic to India
 Evippa sohani Tikader & Malhotra, 1980 Comments: Endemic to India
 Evippa solanensis Tikader & Malhotra, 1980 Comments: Endemic to India
XXVII.e. Genus Evippomma Roewer, 1959 
 Evippomma evippinum (Simon, 1897) Comments: Endemic to India
XXVII.f. Genus Geolycosa Montgomery, 1904
 Geolycosa carli (Reimoser, 1934) Comments: Endemic to India.
 Geolycosa urbana (O.P.-Cambridge, 1876) Distribution: North, Central Africa to India
XXVII.g. Genus Hippasa Simon, 1885 
 Hippasa agelenoides (Simon, 1884) Distribution: India to Taiwan
 Hippasa charamaensis Gajbe, 2004 Comments: Endemic to India
 Hippasa fabreae Gajbe & Gajbe, 1999 Comments: Endemic to India
 Hippasa greenalliae (Blackwall, 1867) Distribution: India, Sri Lanka, China
 Hippasa hansae Gajbe & Gajbe, 1999 Comments: Endemic to India
 Hippasa haryanensis Arora & Monga, 1994 Comments: Endemic to India
 Hippasa himalayensis Gravely, 1924 Comments: Endemic to India
 Hippasa holmerae Thorell, 1895 Distribution: India to Philippines
 Hippasa loundesi Gravely, 1924 Comments: Endemic to India
 Hippasa lycosina Pocock, 1900  Distribution: India, China
 Hippasa madhuae Tikader & Malhotra, 1980 Comments: Endemic to India
 Hippasa madraspatana Gravely, 1924 Comments: Endemic to India
 Hippasa olivacea Thorell, 1887 Distribution: India, Myanmar
 Hippasa partita (O.P.-Cambridge, 1876) Distribution: Egypt to India, Central Asia
 Hippasa pisaurina Pocock, 1900 Distribution: Iraq, India, Pakistan
 Hippasa valiveruensis Patel & Reddy, 1993 Comments: Endemic to India
 Hippasa wigglesworthi Gajbe & Gajbe, 1999 Comments: Endemic to India
XXVII.h. Genus Hogna Simon, 1885
 Hogna himalayensis (Gravely, 1924) Distribution: India, Bhutan, China
 Hogna stictopyga (Thorell, 1895) Distribution: India, Myanmar, Singapore
XXVII.i. Genus Lycosa Latreille, 1804
 Lycosa arambagensis Biswas & Biswas, 1992 Comments: Endemic to India
 Lycosa balaramai Patel & Reddy, 1993 Comments: Endemic to India
 Lycosa barnesi Gravely, 1924 Comments: Endemic to India
 Lycosa bhatnagari Sadana, 1969 Comments: Endemic to India
 Lycosa bistriata Gravely, 1924 Distribution: India, Bhutan
 Lycosa carmichaeli Gravely, 1924 Comments: Endemic to India.
 Lycosa chaperi Simon, 1885 Comments: Endemic to India
 Lycosa choudhuryi Tikader & Malhotra, 1980 Distribution: India, China
 Lycosa fuscana Pocock, 1901 Comments: Endemic to India.
 Lycosa geotubalis Tikader & Malhotra, 1980 Comments: Endemic to India
 Lycosa goliathus Pocock, 1901 Comments: Endemic to India
 Lycosa indagatrix Walckenaer, 1837 Distribution: India, Sri Lanka
 Lycosa iranii Pocock, 1901 Comments: Endemic to India.
 Lycosa jagadalpurensis Gajbe, 2004 Comments: Endemic to India
 Lycosa kempi Gravely, 1924 Distribution: India, Pakistan, Bhutan, China
 Lycosa lambai Tikader & Malhotra, 1980 Comments: Endemic to India
 Lycosa mackenziei Gravely, 1924 Distribution: Pakistan, India, Bangladesh
 Lycosa madani Pocock, 1901 Comments: Endemic to India.
 Lycosa mahabaleshwarensis Tikader & Malhotra, 1980 Comments: Endemic to India
 Lycosa masteri Pocock, 1901 Comments: Endemic to India.
 Lycosa nigrotibialis Simon, 1884 Distribution: India, Bhutan, Myanmar
 Lycosa phipsoni Pocock, 1899 Distribution: India to China, Taiwan
 Lycosa pictula Pocock, 1901 Comments: Endemic to India.
 Lycosa poonaensis Tikader & Malhotra, 1980 Comments: Endemic to India
 Lycosa prolifica Pocock, 1901 Comments: Endemic to India.
 Lycosa shahapuraensis Gajbe, 2004 Comments: Endemic to India
 Lycosa shaktae Bhandari & Gajbe, 2001 Comments: Endemic to India.
 Lycosa shillongensis Tikader & Malhotra, 1980 Comments: Endemic to India.
 Lycosa thoracica Patel & Reddy, 1993 Comments: Endemic to India
 Lycosa tista Tikader, 1970 Comments: Endemic to India
 Lycosa wroughtoni Pocock, 1899 Comments: Endemic to India.
XXVII.j. Genus Margonia Hippa & Lehtinen, 1983 Comments: Monotypic Genus and endemic to India.
 Margonia himalayensis (Gravely, 1924) Comments: Endemic to India.
XXVII.k. Genus Ocyale Audouin, 1826
 Ocyale kalpiensis Gajbe, 2004 Comments: Endemic to India
 Ocyale neatalanta Alderweireldt, 1996 Distribution: West Africa to Myanmar
XXVII.l. Genus Pardosa C. L. Koch, 1847
 Pardosa algoides Schenkel, 1963 Distribution: India, China
 Pardosa alii Tikader, 1977 Comments: Endemic to India
 Pardosa altitudis Tikader & Malhotra, 1980 Distribution: India, China
 Pardosa amkhasensis Tikader & Malhotra, 1976 Comments: Endemic to India.
 Pardosa atropalpis Gravely, 1924 Comments: Endemic to India
 Pardosa balaghatensis Gajbe, 2004 Comments: Endemic to India
 Pardosa bastarensis Gajbe, 2004 Comments: Endemic to India
 Pardosa bargaonensis Gajbe, 2004 Comments: Endemic to India
 Pardosa birmanica Simon, 1884 distribution: Pakistan to China, Philippines, Sumatra
 Pardosa burasantiensis Tikader & Malhotra, 1976 Distribution: India, China
 Pardosa chambaensis Tikader & Malhotra, 1976 Comments: Endemic to India
 Pardosa debolinae Majumder, 2004 Comments: Endemic to India
 Pardosa duplicata Saha, Biswas & Raychaudhuri, 1994 Comments: Endemic to India
 Pardosa fletcheri (Gravely, 1924) Distribution: India, Nepal, Pakistan Comments: Endemic to South Asia.
 Pardosa gopalai Patel & Reddy, 1993 Comments: Endemic to India
 Pardosa heterophthalma (Simon, 1898) Distribution: India to Java
 Pardosa jabalpurensis Gajbe & Gajbe, 1999 Comments: Endemic to India
 Pardosa kalpiensis Gajbe, 2004 Comments: Endemic to India
 Pardosa kupupa (Tikader, 1970) Distribution: India, China
 Pardosa lahorensis Dyal, 1935 Distribution: India, Pakistan Comments: Endemic to South Asia
 Pardosa leucopalpis Gravely, 1924 Distribution: India, Pakistan, Sri Lanka Comments: Endemic to South Asia
 Pardosa minuta Tikader & Malhotra, 1976 Comments: Endemic to India
 Pardosa mukundi Tikader & Malhotra, 1980 Comments: Endemic to India
 Pardosa mysorensis (Tikader & Mukerji, 1971) Comments: Endemic to India.
 Pardosa nicobarica (Thorell, 1891) Comments: Endemic to Andaman & Nicobar Islands
 Pardosa oakleyi Gravely, 1924 Distribution: Pakistan, India, Bangladesh Comments: Endemic to South Asia
 Pardosa orcchaensis Gajbe, 2004 Comments: Endemic to India
 Pardosa partita Simon, 1885 Comments: Endemic to India
 Pardosa porpaensis Gajbe, 2004 Comments: Endemic to India
 Pardosa pseudoannulata (Bösenberg & Strand, 1906) Distribution: Pakistan to Japan, Philippines, Java
 Pardosa pusiola (Thorell, 1891) Distribution: India to China and Java
 Pardosa ranjani Gajbe, 2004 Comments: Endemic to India
 Pardosa rhenockensis (Tikader, 1970) Comments: Endemic to India.
 Pardosa shyamae (Tikader, 1970) Distribution: India, China
 Pardosa songosa Tikader & Malhotra, 1976 Distribution: India, China
 Pardosa subhadrae Patel & Reddy, 1993 Comments: Endemic to India
 Pardosa suchismitae Majumder, 2004 Comments: Endemic to India
 Pardosa sumatrana (Thorell, 1890) Distribution: India, China to Philippines, Sulawesi
 Pardosa sutherlandi (Gravely, 1924) Distribution: India, Nepal Comments: Endemic to South Asia
 Pardosa tappaensis Gajbe, 2004 Comments: Endemic to India
 Pardosa thalassia (Thorell, 1891) Comments: Endemic to Andaman & Nicobar Islands
 Pardosa tikaderi Arora & Monga, 1994 Comments: Endemic to India
 Pardosa timidula (Roewer, 1951) Distribution: Yemen, Sri Lanka, Pakistan
 Pardosa tridentis Caporiacco, 1935 Distribution: India, Nepal Comments: Endemic to South Asia.
XXVII.m. Genus Passiena Thorell, 1890 
 Passiena spinicrus Thorell, 1890 Distribution: India to Hong Kong, Sumatra, Sulawesi
XXVII.n. Genus Shapna Hippa & Lehtinen, 1983 Comments: Monotypic Genus and endemic to India.
 Shapna pluvialis Hippa & Lehtinen, 1983 Comments: Endemic to India
XXVII.o. Genus Trochosa C.L. Koch, 1847
 Trochosa gunturensis Patel & Reddy, 1993 Comments: Endemic to India
 Trochosa himalayensis Tikader & Malhotra, 1980 Comments: Endemic to India
 Trochosa punctipes (Gravely, 1924) Comments: Endemic to India.
XXVII.p. Genus Wadicosa Zyuzin, 1985 
 Wadicosa quadrifera (Gravely, 1924) Distribution: India, Sri Lanka
XXVII.q. Genus Zoica Simon, 1898
 Zoica puellula (Simon, 1898) Distribution: India, Sri Lanka Comments: Endemic to South Asia

XXVIII. Family Mimetidae Simon, 1881
XXVIII.a. Genus Melaenosia Simon, 1906 Comments: Monotypic Genus and endemic to India.
 Melaenosia pustulifera Simon, 1906 Comments: Endemic to India
XXVIII.b. Genus Mimetus Hentz, 1832 
 Mimetus indicus Simon, 1906 Comments: Endemic to India
 Mimetus tikaderi Gajbe, 1992 Comments: Endemic to India

XXIX. Family Miturgidae Simon, 1885
XXIX.a. Genus Cheiracanthium C. L. Koch, 1839 
 Cheiracanthium adjacens O. P.-Cambridge, 1885 Distribution: China, India
 Cheiracanthium conflexum Simon, 1906 Comments: Endemic to India
 Cheiracanthium conspersum (Thorell, 1891) Comments: Endemic to Andaman & Nicobar Islands
 Cheiracanthium danieli Tikader, 1975 Comments: Endemic to India
 Cheiracanthium himalayense Gravely, 1931 Comments: Endemic to India
 Cheiracanthium incomptum (Thorell, 1891) Comments: Endemic to Andaman & Nicobar Islands
 Cheiracanthium indicum O.P.-Cambridge, 1874 Distribution: India, Sri Lanka Comments: Endemic to South Asia
 Cheiracanthium inornatum O.P.-Cambridge, 1874 Comments: Endemic to India
 Cheiracanthium insigne O.P.-Cambridge, 1874 Distribution: India, Sri Lanka, China
 Cheiracanthium jabalpurense Majumder & Tikader, 1991 Comments: Endemic to India
 Cheiracanthium kashmirense Majumder & Tikader, 1991 Comments: Endemic to India
 Cheiracanthium melanostomum (Thorell, 1895) Distribution: India, Bangladesh,
 Cheiracanthium mysorense Majumder & Tikader, 1991 Comments: Endemic to India
 Cheiracanthium nalsaroverense Patel & Patel, 1973 Comments: Endemic to India
 Cheiracanthium pauriense Majumder & Tikader, Comments: Endemic to India
 Cheiracanthium pelasgicum (C.L. Koch, 1837) Distribution: Palearctic
 Cheiracanthium poonaense Majumder & Tikader, 1991 Comments: Endemic to India
 Cheiracanthium punjabense Sadana & Bajaj, 1980 Comments: Endemic to India
 Cheiracanthium sambii Patel & Reddy, 1991 Comments: Endemic to India
 Cheiracanthium saraswatii Tikader, 1962 Comments: Endemic to India
 Cheiracanthium seshii Patel & Reddy, 1991 Comments: Endemic to India.
 Cheiracanthium sikkimense Majumder & Tikader, 1991 Comments: Endemic to India
 Cheiracanthium triviale (Thorell, 1895) Distribution: India, Myanmar
 Cheiracanthium trivittatum Simon, 1906 Comments: Endemic to India
 Cheiracanthium turiae Strand, 1917 Distribution: Thailand to Queensland
 Cheiracanthium vorax O.P.-Cambridge, 1874 Comments: Endemic to India
XXIX.b. Genus Eutichurus Simon, 1897
 Eutichurus chingliputensis Majumder & Tikader, 1991 Comments: Endemic to India
 Eutichurus tezpurensis Biswas, 1991 Comments: Endemic to India
XXIX.c. Genus Systaria Simon, 1897 
 Systaria barkudensis (Gravely, 1931) Comments: Endemic to India.

XXX. Family Mysmenidae Petrunkevitch, 1928
XXX.a. Genus Iardinis Simon, 1899 Comments: Endemic to South Asia.
 Iardinis mussardi Brignoli, 1980 Comments: Endemic to India

XXXI Family Nemesiidae Simon, 1892
XXXI.a. Genus Damarchus Thorell, 1891 
 Damarchus assamensis Hirst, 1909 Comments: Endemic to India
 Damarchus bifidus Gravely, 1935 Comments: Endemic to India
 Damarchus excavatus Gravely, 1921 Comments: Endemic to India

XXXII Family Ochyroceratidae Fage, 1912
XXXII.a. Genus Althepus Thorell, 1898 
 Althepus incognitus Brignoli, 1973 Comments: Endemic to India

XXXIII Family Oecobiidae Blackwall, 1862
XXXIII.a. Genus Oecobius Lucas, 1846
 Oecobius chiasma Barman, 1978 Comments: Endemic to India
 Oecobius marathaus Tikader, 1962 Distribution: Pan tropical
 Oecobius putus O.P.-Cambridge, 1876 Distribution: Egypt, Sudan to Azerbaijan (USA, introduced)
XXXIII.b. Genus Uroctea Dufour, 1820 
 Uroctea indica Pocock, 1900 Comments: Endemic to India
 Uroctea manii Patel, 1987 Comments: Endemic to India

XXXIV Family Oonopidae Simon, 1890
XXXIV.a. Genus Dysderoides Fage, 1946 
 Dysderoides typhlos Fage, 1946 Comments: Endemic to India
XXXIV.b. Genus Gamasomorpha Karsch, 1881
 Gamasomorpha clypeolaria Simon, 1907 Comments: Endemic to India
 Gamasomorpha nigripalpis Simon, 1893 Distribution: India, Sri Lanka Comments: Endemic to South Asia
 Gamasomorpha taprobanica Simon, 1893 Distribution: India, Sri Lanka Comments: Endemic to South Asia
XXXIV.c. Genus Ischnothyreus Simon, 1893
 Ischnothyreus deccanensis Tikader & Malhotra, 1974 Comments: Endemic to India
 Ischnothyreus shillongensis Tikader, 1968 Distribution: India, Bhutan Comments: Endemic to South Asia.
XXXIV.d. Genus Triaeris Simon, 1891
 Triaeris barela Gajbe, 2004 Comments: Endemic to India
 Triaeris glenniei Fage, 1946 Comments: Endemic to India
 Triaeris khashiensis Tikader, 1966 Comments: Endemic to India
 Triaeris manii Tikader & Malhotra, 1974 Comments: Endemic to India
 Triaeris nagarensis Tikader & Malhotra, 1974 Comments: Endemic to India
 Triaeris nagpurensis Tikader & Malhotra, 1974 Comments: Endemic to India
 Triaeris poonaensis Tikader & Malhotra, 1974 Comments: Endemic to India

XXXV. Family Oxyopidae Thorell, 1870
XXXV.a. Genus Hamataliwa Keyserling, 1887 
 Hamataliwa sikkimensis (Tikader, 1970) Distribution: India, China
XXXV.b. Genus Oxyopes Latreille, 1804
 Oxyopes armatipalpis Strand, 1912 Comments: Endemic to India
 Oxyopes ashae Gajbe, 1999 Comments: Endemic to India
 Oxyopes assamensis Tikader, 1969 Comments: Endemic to India
 Oxyopes bharatae Gajbe, 1999 Comments: Endemic to India
 Oxyopes biharensis Gajbe, 1999 Comments: Endemic to India
 Oxyopes birmanicus Thorell, 1887 Distribution: India, China to Sumatra
 Oxyopes boriensis Bodkhe & Vankhede, 2012 Comments: Endemic to India
 Oxyopes chittrae Tikader, 1965 Synonym: Oxyopes chitrae Tikader, 1965 Comments: Endemic to India
 Oxyopes elongatus Biswas et al., 1996 Distribution: India, China to Sumatra
 Oxyopes gemellus Thorell, 1891 Distribution: India, Malaysia
 Oxyopes gujaratensis Gajbe, 1999 Comments: Endemic to India
 Oxyopes gurjanti Sadana & Gupta, 1995 Comments: Endemic to India
 Oxyopes hindostanicus Pocock, 1901 Distribution: India, Sri Lanka Comments: Endemic to South Asia
 Oxyopes indicus (Walckenaer, 1805) Comments: Endemic to India
 Oxyopes jabalpurensis Gajbe & Gajbe, 1999 Comments: Endemic to India
 Oxyopes javanus Thorell, 1887 Distribution: India, China to Java, Philippines
a.    O. javanus nicobaricus Strand, 1907 Comments: Endemic to Andaman & Nicobar Islands
 Oxyopes jubilans O.P.-Cambridge, 1885 Distribution: India, Pakistan, China
 Oxyopes kamalae Gajbe, 1999 Comments: Endemic to India.
 Oxyopes ketani Gajbe & Gajbe, 1999 Comments: Endemic to India
 Oxyopes kusumae Gajbe, 1999 Comments: Endemic to India
 Oxyopes lepidus (Blackwall, 1864) Comments: Endemic to India
 Oxyopes lineatus Latreille, 1806 Distribution: Palearctic
 Oxyopes longinquus Thorell, 1891 Distribution: India, Myanmar
 Oxyopes longispinus Saha & Raychaudhuri, 2003 Comments: Endemic to India
 Oxyopes ludhianaensis Sadana & Goel, 1995 Comments: Endemic to India
 Oxyopes minutus Biswas et al., 1996 Comments: Endemic to India
 Oxyopes naliniae Gajbe, 1999 Comments: Endemic to India
 Oxyopes ovatus Biswas et al., 1996 Comments: Endemic to India
 Oxyopes pandae Tikader, 1969 Comments: Endemic to India
 Oxyopes pankaji Gajbe & Gajbe, 2001 Comments: Endemic to India
 Oxyopes pawani Gajbe, 1992 Comments: Endemic to India
 Oxyopes rajai Saha & Raychaudhuri, 2004 Comments: Endemic to India
 Oxyopes ratnae Tikader, 1970 Comments: Endemic to India
 Oxyopes reddyi Majumder, 2004 Comments: Endemic to India
 Oxyopes reticulatus Biswas et al., 1996 Comments: Endemic to India
 Oxyopes rukminiae Gajbe, 1999 Comments: Endemic to India
 Oxyopes ryvesi Pocock, 1901 Comments: Endemic to India.
 Oxyopes sakuntalae Tikader, 1970 Comments: Endemic to India
 Oxyopes shweta Tikader, 1970 Distribution: India, China
 Oxyopes sitae Tikader, 1970 Comments: Endemic to India
 Oxyopes subhadrae Tikader, 1970 Comments: Endemic to India
 Oxyopes subimali Biswas et al., 1996 Comments: Endemic to India
 Oxyopes sunandae Tikader, 1970 Comments: Endemic to India
 Oxyopes sushilae Tikader, 1965 Distribution: India, China
 Oxyopes tikaderi Biswas & Majumder, 1995 Comments: Endemic to India
 Oxyopes travancoricola Strand, 1912 Comments: Endemic to India
 Oxyopes wroughtoni Pocock, 1901 Comments: Endemic to India
XXXV.c. Genus Peucetia Thorell, 1869
 Peucetia akwadaensis Patel, 1978 Distribution: India, China
 Peucetia ashae Gajbe & Gajbe, 1999 Comments: Endemic to India
 Peucetia biharensis Gajbe, 1999 Comments: Endemic to India
 Peucetia choprai Tikader, 1965 Comments: Endemic to India
 Peucetia elegans (Blackwall, 1864) Comments: Endemic to India
 Peucetia gauntleta Saha & Raychaudhuri, 2004 Comments: Endemic to India
 Peucetia graminea Pocock, 1900 Comments: Endemic to India
 Peucetia harishankarensis Biswas, 1975 Comments: Endemic to India
 Peucetia jabalpurensis Gajbe & Gajbe, 1999 Comments: Endemic to India
 Peucetia ketani Gajbe, 1992 Comments: Endemic to India
 Peucetia latikae Tikader, 1970 Distribution: India, China
 Peucetia pawani Gajbe, 1999 Comments: Endemic to India
 Peucetia punjabensis Gajbe, 1999 Comments: Endemic to India
 Peucetia rajani Gajbe, 1999 Comments: Endemic to India

 Peucetia viridana (Stoliczka, 1869) Distribution: India to Myanmar
 Peucetia viveki Gajbe, 1999 Comments: Endemic to India
 Peucetia yogeshi Gajbe, 1999 Comments: Endemic to India
XXXV.d. Genus Tapponia Simon, 1885
 Tapponia insulana Thorell, 1891 Comments: Endemic to Andaman & Nicobar Islands

XXXVI Family Palpimanidae Thorell, 1870
XXXVI.a. Genus Palpimanus Dufour, 1820
 Palpimanus gibbulus Dufour, 1820 Distribution: Mediterranean, Central Asia
 Palpimanus vultuosus Simon, 1897 Comments: Endemic to India
XXXVI.b. Genus Sarascelis Simon, 1897 
 Sarascelis raffrayi Simon, 1893 Distribution: India, Malaysia

XXXVII Family Philodromidae Thorell, 1870
XXXVII.a. Genus Apollophanes O.P.-Cambridge, 1898 
 Apollophanes bangalores Tikader, 1963 Comments: Endemic to India
XXXVII.b. Genus Ebo Keyserling, 1884 
 Ebo bharatae Tikader, 1965 Comments: Endemic to India
XXXVII.c. Genus Gephyrota Strand, 1932 
 Gephyrota pudica (Simon, 1906) Comments: Endemic to India
XXXVII.d. Genus Philodromus Walckenaer, 1826 
 Philodromus ashae Gajbe & Gajbe, 1999 Comments: Endemic to India
 Philodromus assamensis Tikader, 1962 Distribution: India, China
 Philodromus barmani Tikader, 1980 Comments: Endemic to India
 Philodromus betrabatai Tikader, 1966 Comments: Endemic to India
 Philodromus bhagirathai Tikader, 1966 Comments: Endemic to India
 Philodromus bigibbus (O.P.-Cambridge, 1876) Distribution: Egypt, Sudan, Arabia, India
 Philodromus chambaensis Tikader, 1980 Distribution: India, China
 Philodromus decoratus Tikader, 1962 Comments: Endemic to India
 Philodromus devhutai Tikader, 1966 Comments: Endemic to India
 Philodromus domesticus Tikader, 1962 Comments: Endemic to India
 Philodromus durvei Tikader, 1980 Comments: Endemic to India
 Philodromus frontosus Simon, 1897 Comments: Endemic to India
 Philodromus jabalpurensis Gajbe & Gajbe, 1999 Comments: Endemic to India
 Philodromus kendrabatai Tikader, 1966 Comments: Endemic to India
 Philodromus lepidus Blackwall, 1870 Distribution: Mediterranean to India
 Philodromus maliniae Tikader, 1966 Comments: Endemic to India
 Philodromus manikae Tikader, 1971 Comments: Endemic to India
 Philodromus mohiniae Tikader, 1966 Comments: Endemic to India
 Philodromus pali Gajbe & Gajbe, 2001 Comments: Endemic to India
 Philodromus sanjeevi Gajbe, 2004 Comments: Endemic to India
 Philodromus shillongensis Tikader, 1962 Comments: Endemic to India
 Philodromus tiwarii Basu, 1973 Comments: Endemic to India
XXXVII.e. Genus Psellonus Simon, 1897 Comments: Monotypic Genus and endemic to India.
 Psellonus planus Simon, 1897 Comments: Endemic to India
XXXVII.f. Genus Thanatus C.L. Koch, 1837 
 Thanatus dhakuricus Tikader, 1960 Comments: Endemic to India
 Thanatus indicus Simon, 1885 Comments: Endemic to India
 Thanatus jabalpurensis Gajbe & Gajbe, 1999 Comments: Endemic to India
 Thanatus lanceoletus Tikader, 1966 Comments: Endemic to India.
 Thanatus ketani Bhandari & Gajbe, 2001 Comments: Endemic to India
 Thanatus mandali Tikader, 1965 Comments: Endemic to India
 Thanatus prolixus Simon, 1897 Comments: Endemic to India
 Thanatus simplicipalpis Simon, 1882 Distribution: India, Yemen
 Thanatus stripatus Tikader, 1980 Comments: Endemic to India
XXXVII.g. Genus Tibellus Simon, 1875 
 Tibellus chaturshingi Tikader, 1962 Comments: Endemic to India
 Tibellus elongatus Tikader, 1960 Comments: Endemic to India
 Tibellus jabalpurensis Gajbe & Gajbe, 1999 Comments: Endemic to India
 Tibellus katrajghatus Tikader, 1962 Comments: Endemic to India
 Tibellus pashanensis Tikader, 1980 Comments: Endemic to India
 Tibellus pateli Tikader, 1980 Comments: Endemic to India.
 Tibellus poonaensis Tikader, 1962 Comments: Endemic to India
 Tibellus vitilis Simon, 1906 Distribution: India, Sri Lanka Comments: Endemic to South Asia

XXXVIII. Family Pholcidae C.L. Koch, 1851
XXXVIII.a. Genus Artema Walckenaer, 1837
 Artema atlanta Walckenaer, 1837 Distribution: Pantropical
XXXVIII.b. Genus Crossopriza Simon, 1893 
 Crossopriza lyoni (Blackwall, 1867) Distribution: Cosmopolitan
XXXVIII.c. Genus Pholcus Walckenaer, 1805
 Pholcus kapuri Tikader, 1977 Comments: Endemic to Andaman & Nicobar Islands
 Pholcus phalangioides (Fuesslin, 1775) Distribution: Cosmopolitan
 Pholcus podophthalmus Simon, 1893 Distribution: India, China
XXXVIII.d. Genus Smeringopus Simon, 1890 
  Smeringopus pallidus (Blackwall, 1858) Distribution: Cosmopolitan

XXXIX. Family Pimoidae Wunderlich, 1986
XXXIX.a. Genus Pimoa Chamberlin & Ivie, 1943
 Pimoa crispa (Fage, 1946) Comments: Endemic to India
 Pimoa gandhii Hormiga, 1994 Comments: Endemic to India
 Pimoa indiscreta Hormiga, 1994 Comments: Endemic to India

XL. Family Pisauridae Simon, 1890

XL.a. Genus Dendrolycosa Doleschall, 1859
 Dendrolycosa gracilis Thorell, 1891 Comments: Endemic to Andaman & Nicobar Islands
 Dendrolycosa stauntoni Pocock, 1900 Comments: Endemic to India
XL.b. Genus Eucamptopus Pocock, 1900 Comments: Monotypic Genus and endemic to India.
 Eucamptopus coronatus Pocock, 1900 Comments: Endemic to India
XL.c. Genus Euprosthenops Pocock, 1897 
 Euprosthenops ellioti (O. P.-Cambridge, 1877) Comments: Endemic to India
XL.d. Genus Nilus O. P.-Cambridge, 1876
 Nilus marginatus (Simon, 1888) Comments: Endemic to Andaman & Nicobar Islands
 Nilus spadicarius (Simon, 1897) Comments: Endemic to India
XL.e. Genus Perenethis L. Koch, 1878
 Perenethis sindica (Simon, 1897) Distribution: India, Sri Lanka, Nepal, Philippines
XL.f. Genus Pisaura Simon, 1885
 Pisaura bobbiliensis Reddy & Patel, 1993 Comments: Endemic to India
 Pisaura decorata Patel & Reddy, 1990 Comments: Endemic to India
 Pisaura gitae Tikader, 1970 Comments: Endemic to India
 Pisaura podilensis Patel & Reddy, 1990 Comments: Endemic to India
 Pisaura putiana Barrion & Litsinger, 1995 Distribution: India, Philippines
 Pisaura swamii Patel, 1987 Comments: Endemic to India
XL.g. Genus Thalassius Simon, 1885 = Nilus O. Pickard-Cambridge, 1876
 Thalassius albocinctus (Doleschall, 1859) = Nilus albocinctus (Doleschall, 1859) Distribution: Myanmar to Philippines
 Thalassius phipsoni F.O.P.-Cambridge, 1898 = Nilus phipsoni (F. O. Pickard-Cambridge, 1898) Distribution: India to China
XL.h. Genus Tinus F.O.P.-Cambridge, 1901
 Tinus chandrakantii Reddy & Patel, 1993 Comments: Endemic to India
 Tinus sikkimus Tikader, 1970 Comments: Endemic to India

XLI. Family Prodidomidae Simon, 1884
The family is no longer recognized by the World Spider Catalog; all species are placed in Gnaphosidae.

XLI.a. Genus Prodidomus Hentz, 1847
 Prodidomus chaperi (Simon, 1884) Comments: Endemic to India
 Prodidomus palkai Cooke, 1972 Comments: Endemic to India
 Prodidomus papavanasanemensis Cooke, 1972 Comments: Endemic to India
 Prodidomus saharanpurensis (Tikader, 1982) Tikader, 1982 Comments: Endemic to India.
 Prodidomus sirohi Platnick, 1976 Comments: Endemic to India
 Prodidomus tirumalai Cooke, 1972 Comments: Endemic to India
 Prodidomus venkateswarai Cooke, 1972 Comments: Endemic to India
XLI.b. Genus Zimiris Simon, 1882
 Zimiris diffusa Platnick & Penney, 2004 Distribution: India, St. Helena, Socotra
 Zimiris doriai Simon, 1882 Distribution: India, Sudan, Yemen

XLII. Family Psechridae Simon, 1890
XLII.a. Genus Fecenia Simon, 1887
 Fecenia nicobarensis (Tikader, 1977) Comments: Endemic to Andaman & Nicobar Islands.
 Fecenia travancoria Pocock, 1899 Distribution: India to Sumatra
XLII.b. Genus Psechrus Thorell, 1878
 Psechrus ghecuanus Thorell, 1897 Distribution: India, Myanmar, Thailand, China
 Psechrus himalayanus Simon, 1906 Distribution: India, Nepal Comments: Endemic to South Asia
 Psechrus torvus (O.P.-Cambridge, 1869) Distribution: Sri Lanka, India, China, Taiwan

XLIII. Family Salticidae Blackwall, 1841
XLIII.a. Genus Aelurillus Simon, 1884
 Aelurillus improvisus Azarkina, 2002 Comments: Endemic to India
 Aelurillus minimontanus Azarkina, 2002 Comments: Endemic to India
 Aelurillus quadrimaculatus Simon, 1889 Distribution: India, Sri Lanka Comments: Endemic to South Asia
XLIII.b. Genus Asemonea O.P.-Cambridge, 1869
 Asemonea santinagarensis (Biswas & Biswas, 1992) Comments: Endemic to India.
 Asemonea tenuipes (O.P.-Cambridge, 1869) Distribution: Sri Lanka to Thailand
XLIII.c. Genus Bavia
 Bavia kairali (Lucas, 1846) Distribution: Endemic to India.
XLIII.c. Genus Bianor Peckham & Peckham, 1886
 Bianor albobimaculatus (Lucas, 1846) Distribution: South Africa, Mediterranean to Central Asia
 Bianor angulosus (Karsch, 1879) Distribution: India, Bhutan, Sri Lanka, Thailand, Vietnam
 Bianor incitatus Thorell, 1890 Distribution: India to China, Java, Sumatra, Caroline Islands
 Bianor narmadaensis (Tikader), 1975 Comments: Endemic to India
 Bianor pashanensis (Tikader), 1975 Comments: Endemic to India
 Bianor pseudomaculatus Logunov, 2001 Distribution: India, Bhutan, Vietnam
 Bianor punjabicus Logunov, 2001 Distribution: India, Afghanistan
XLIII.d. Genus Brettus Thorell, 1895
 Brettus albolimbatus Simon, 1900 Distribution: India, China
 Brettus anchorum Wanless, 1979 Distribution: India, Nepal Comments: Endemic to South Asia
XLIII.e. Genus Bristowia Reimoser, 1934 Comments: Monotypic genus.
 Bristowia heterospinosa Reimoser, 1934 Distribution: India, China, Korea, Vietnam, Japan, Krakatau
XLIII.f. Genus Carrhotus Thorell, 1891
 Carrhotus sannio (Thorell, 1877) Distribution: India to Sulawesi
 Carrhotus tristis Thorell, 1895 Distribution: India, Myanmar
 Carrhotus viduus (C.L. Koch, 1846) Distribution: India to China, Java
XLIII.g. Genus Chalcoscirtus Bertkau, 1880
 Chalcoscirtus glacialis Caporiacco, 1935 Distribution: Russia to India and Alaska
 Chalcoscirtus martensi Zabka, 1980 Distribution: Central Asia, Nepal, India, China
XLIII.h. Genus Chalcotropis Simon, 1902 
 Chalcotropis pennata Simon, 1902 Comments: Endemic to India
XLIII.i. Genus Colaxes Simon, 1900 Comments: Endemic to South Asia.
 Colaxes nitidiventris Simon, 1900 Comments: Endemic to India
XLIII.j. Genus Cosmophasis Simon, 1901
 Cosmophasis miniaceomicans (Simon, 1888) Comments: Endemic to Andaman & Nicobar Islands
XLIII.k. Genus Curubis Simon, 1902 Comments: Endemic to South Asia.
 Curubis sipeki Dobroruka, 2004 Comments: Endemic to India.
XLIII.l. Genus Cyrba Simon, 1876
 Cyrba ocellata (Kroneberg, 1875) Distribution: Somalia, Central Asia to Australia
XLIII.m. Genus Cytaea Keyserling, 1882 
 Cytaea albolimbata Simon, 1888 Comments: Endemic to Andaman & Nicobar Islands
XLIII.n. Genus Dexippus Thorell, 1891 
 Dexippus topali Prószyn’ski, 1992 Comments: Endemic to India
XLIII.o. Genus Epeus Peckham & Peckham, 1886
 Epeus albus Prószyn’ski, 1992 Comments: Endemic to India
 Epeus chilapataensis (Biswas & Biswas, 1992) Comments: Endemic to India.
 Epeus indicus Prószyn’ski, 1992 Comments: Endemic to India
XLIII.p. Genus Epocilla Thorell, 1887
 Epocilla aurantiaca (Simon, 1885) Distribution: India to Malaysia
 Epocilla xylina Simon, 1906 Comments: Endemic to India
XLIII.q. Genus Euophrys C. L. Koch, 1834
 Euophrys chiriatapuensis Tikader, 1977 Comments: Endemic to India
 Euophrys minuta Prószyn’ski, 1992 Comments: Endemic to India
XLIII.r. Genus Ghumattus Prószyn’ski, 1992 Comments: Monotypic Genus and endemic to India.
 Ghumattus primus Prószyn’ski, 1992 Comments: Endemic to India
XLIII.s. Genus Habrocestoides Prószyn’ski, 1992 Comments: Endemic to South Asia.
 Habrocestoides bengalensis Prószyn’ski, 1992 Comments: Endemic to India
 Habrocestoides darjeelingus Logunov, 1999 Comments: Endemic to India.
 Habrocestoides indicus Prószyn’ski, 1992 Comments: Endemic to India.
 Habrocestoides micans Logunov, 1999 Comments: Endemic to India.
 Habrocestoides nitidus Logunov, 1999 Comments: Endemic to India
XLIII.t. Genus Harmochirus Simon, 1885
 Harmochirus brachiatus (Thorell, 1977) Distribution: India, Bhutan to Taiwan, Indonesia
 Harmochirus lloydi Narayan, 1915 Comments: Endemic to India
 Harmochirus zabkai Logunov, 2001 Distribution: India, Nepal, Vietnam
XLIII.u. Genus Hasarius Simon, 1871 
 Hasarius adansoni (Audouin, 1826) Distribution: Cosmopolitan
XLIII.v. Genus Heliophanoides Prószyn’ski, 1992 Comments: Endemic to South Asia.
 Heliophanoides epigynalis Prószyn’ski, 1992 Comments: Endemic to India
 Heliophanoides spermathecalis Prószyn’ski, 1992 Comments: Endemic to India
XLIII.w. Genus Hindumanes Logunov, 2004 Comments: Monotypic Genus and endemic to India.
 Hindumanes karnatakaensis (Tikader & Biswas, 1978) Comments: Endemic to India
XLIII.x. Genus Hispo Simon, 1885 
 Hispo bipartita Simon, 1903 Distribution: India, Sri Lanka Comments: Endemic to South Asia
XLIII.y.  Genus Hyllus C.L. Koch, 1846
 Hyllus bos (Sundevall, 1833) Comments: Endemic to India
 Hyllus pudicus Thorell, 1895 Distribution: India, Myanmar
 Hyllus manu John T. D. Caleb, Christudhas A., Laltanpuii, K. & Chitra, M, 2014 Distribution: Chennai
 Hyllus semicupreus (Simon, 1885) Distribution: India, Sri Lanka Comments: Endemic to South Asia.
XLIII.z. Genus Imperceptus Prószyn’ski, 1992 Comments: Monotypic Genus and endemic to India.
 Imperceptus minutus Prószyn’ski, 1992 Comments: Endemic to India
XLIII.aa. Genus Jajpurattus Prószyn’ski, 1992 Comments: Monotypic Genus and endemic to India.
 Jajpurattus incertus Prószyn’ski, 1992 Comments: Endemic to India
XLIII.ab. Genus Langona Simon, 1901
 Langona goaensis Prószyn’ski, 1992 Comments: Endemic to India.
 Langona kurracheensis Heciak & Prószyn’ski, 1983 Comments: Endemic to India
 Langona simoni Heciak & Prószyn’ski, 1983 Comments: Endemic to India
 Langona tigrina (Simon, 1885) Comments: Endemic to India
XLIII.ac.  Genus Madhyattus Prószyn’ski, 1992 Comments: Monotypic Genus and endemic to India.
 Madhyattus jabalpurensis Prószyn’ski, 1992 Comments: Endemic to India
XLIII.ad. Genus Marpissa C.L. Koch, 1846
 Marpissa anusuae Tikader & Biswas, 1981 Comments: Endemic to India
 Marpissa arambagensis Biswas & Biswas, 1992 Comments: Endemic to India
 Marpissa dayapurensis Majumder, 2004 Comments: Endemic to India
 Marpissa decorata Tikader, 1974 Comments: Endemic to India
 Marpissa endenae Biswas & Biswas, 1992 Comments: Endemic to India
 Marpissa kalapani Tikader, 1977 Comments: Endemic to Andaman & Nicobar Islands
 Marpissa kalighatensis Biswas & Biswas, 1992 Comments: Endemic to Andaman & Nicobar Islands
 Marpissa lakhmikantapursansis Majumder, 2004 Comments: Endemic to India
 Marpissa manipuriensis Biswas & Biswas, 2004 Comments: Endemic to India
 Marpissa nutanae Biswas & Biswas, 1984 Comments: Endemic to Andaman & Nicobar Islands
 Marpissa prathamae Biswas & Biswas, 1984 Comments: Endemic to Andaman & Nicobar Islands
 Marpissa singhi Monga, Singh & Sadana, 1989 Comments: Endemic to Andaman & Nicobar Islands
 Marpissa tigrina Tikader, 1965 Comments: Endemic to Andaman & Nicobar Islands
 Marpissa tikaderi Biswas, 1984 Comments: Endemic to Andaman & Nicobar Islands
XLIII.ae. Genus Menemerus Simon, 1868
 Menemerus albocinctus Keyserling, 1890 Comments: Endemic to Andaman & Nicobar Islands
 Menemerus bivittatus (Dufour, 1831) Distribution: Pantropical
 Menemerus brachygnathus (Thorell, 1887) Distribution: India to Japan
 Menemerus brevibulbis (Thorell, 1887) Distribution: Senegal to India
 Menemerus fulvus (L. Koch, 1878) Distribution: India to Japan
XLIII.af. Genus Modunda Simon, 1901
 Modunda staintoni (O.P.-Cambridge, 1872) Distribution: Egypt to India
XLIII.ag. Genus Myrmarachne MacLeay, 1839
 Myrmarachne bengalensis Tikader, 1973 Comments: Endemic to India
 Myrmarachne calcuttaensis Biswas, 1984 Comments: Endemic to India
 Myrmarachne dirangicus Bastawade, 2002 Comments: Endemic to India
 Myrmarachne himalayensis Narayan, 1915 Comments: Endemic to India
 Myrmarachne hidaspis Caporiacco, 1935 Comments: Endemic to India.
 Myrmarachne incerta Narayan, 1915 Comments: Endemic to India
 Myrmarachne jajpurensis Prószyn’ski, 1992 Comments: Endemic to India
 Myrmarachne laeta (Thorell, 1887) Distribution: India, Nias Island, China
 a.     M. laeta flava Narayan, 1915 Comments: Endemic to India
 Myrmarachne ludhianaensis Sadana & Gupta, 1998 Comments: Endemic to India
 Myrmarachne manducator (Westwood, 1841) Distribution: India, Myanmar, Malaysia, Sumatra
 Myrmarachne maratha Tikader, 1973 Comments: Endemic to India
 Myrmarachne megachelae Ganesh Kumar & Mahanasundaram, 1998 Comments: Endemic to India
 Myrmarachne opaca (Karsch, 1880) Comments: Endemic to India
 Myrmarachne orientales Tikader, 1973 Distribution: Pakistan, India Comments: Endemic to South Asia
 Myrmarachne paivae Narayan, 1915 Comments: Endemic to India
 Myrmarachne plataleoides (O.P.-Cambridge, 1869) Distribution: India, Sri Lanka, China, Southeast Asia
 Myrmarachne platypalpus Bradoo, 1980 Comments: Endemic to India
 Myrmarachne poonaensis Tikader, 1973 Comments: Endemic to India
 Myrmarachne providens (Peckham & Peckham, 1892) Distribution: India, Sri Lanka Comments: Endemic to South Asia
 Myrmarachne ramunni Narayan, 1915 Comments: Endemic to India
 Myrmarachne roeweri Reimoser, 1934 Comments: Endemic to India
 Myrmarachne satarensis Narayan, 1915 Comments: Endemic to India
 Myrmarachne transversa (Mukerjee, 1930) Comments: Endemic to India.
 Myrmarachne tristis (Simon, 1882) Distribution: Libya to India
 Myrmarachne uniseriata Narayan, 1915 Comments: Endemic to India
XLIII.ah. Genus Onomastus Simon, 1900 
 Onomastus patellaris Simon, 1900 Comments: Endemic to India
XLIII.ai. Genus Orissania Prószyn’ski, 1992 Comments: Monotypic Genus and endemic to India.
 Orissania daitarica Prószyn’ski, 1992 Comments: Endemic to India
XLIII.aj. Genus Pancorius Simon, 1902
 Pancorius dabanis (Hogg, 1922) Comments: Endemic to India.
 Pancorius darjeelingianus Prószyn’ski, 1992 Comments: Endemic to India
 Pancorius magnus Zabka, 1985 Distribution: India, Vietnam
 Pancorius submontanus Prószyn’ski, 1992 Comments: Endemic to India
 Pancorius tagorei Prószyn’ski, 1992 Comments: Endemic to India
XLIII.ak. Genus Pandisus Simon, 1900 
 Pandisus indicus Prószyn’ski, 1992 Comments: Endemic to India
XLIII.al. Genus Panysinus Simon, 1901 
 Panysinus grammicus Simon, 1902 Comments: Endemic to India
XLIII.am. Genus Pellenes Simon, 1876 
 Pellenes allegrii Caporiacco, 1935 Distribution: Central Asia, India
XLIII.an. Genus Phaeacius Simon, 1900 
 Phaeacius lancearius (Thorell, 1895) Distribution: India, Myanmar
XLIII.ao. Genus Phidippus C. L. Koch, 1846
 Phidippus bengalensis Tikader, 1977 Comments: Endemic to India
 Phidippus bhimrakshiti Gajbe, 2004 Comments: Endemic to India
 Phidippus calcuttaensis Biswas, 1984 Comments: Endemic to India
 Phidippus khandalaensis Tikader, 1977 Comments: Endemic to India
 Phidippus punjabensis Tikader, 1974 Comments: Endemic to India
 Phidippus yashodharae Tikader, 1977 Comments: Endemic to Andaman & Nicobar Islands
XLIII.ap. Genus Phintella Strand, 1906
 Phintella accentifera (Simon, 1901) Distribution: India, China, Vietnam
 Phintella alboterminus John T. D. Caleb, 2014 Distribution: Chennai
 Phintella assamica Prószyn’ski, 1992 Comments: Endemic to India
 Phintella bifurcata Prószyn’ski, 1992 Comments: Endemic to India
 Phintella coonooriensis Prószyn’ski, 1992 Comments: Endemic to India
 Phintella debilis (Thorell, 1891) Distribution: India to Java
 Phintella indica (Simon, 1901) Comments: Endemic to India.
 Phintella macrops (Simon, 1901) Comments: Endemic to India.
 Phintella mussooriensis Prószyn’ski, 1992 Comments: Endemic to India
 Phintella nilgirica Prószyn’ski, 1992 Comments: Endemic to India
 Phintella reinhardti (Thorell, 1891) Comments: Endemic Andaman & Nicobar Islands.
 Phintella suknana Prószyn’ski, 1992 Comments: Endemic to India
 Phintella vittata (C.L. Koch, 1846) Distribution: India to Philippines
XLIII.aq. Genus Phlegra Simon, 1876
 Phlegra dhakuriensis (Tikader, 1974) Distribution: India, Pakistan Comments: Endemic to South Asia.
XLIII.ar. Genus Pilia Simon, 1902 
 Pilia saltabunda Simon, 1902 Comments: Endemic to India
XLIII.as. Genus Piranthus Thorell, 1895 
 Piranthus casteti Simon, 1900 Comments: Endemic to India
XLIII.at. Genus Plexippus C.L. Koch, 1846
 Plexippus andamanensis (Tikader, 1977) Comments: Endemic to Andaman & Nicobar Islands.
 Plexippus calcutaensis (Tikader, 1974) Distribution: India, Philippines
 Plexippus paykulli (Audouin, 1826) Distribution: Cosmopolitan
 Plexippus petersi (Karsch, 1878) Distribution: Africa to Japan, Philippines, Hawaii
 Plexippus redimitus Simon, 1902 Distribution: India, Sri Lanka
XLIII.au. Genus Portia Karsch, 1878 
 Portia albimana (Simon, 1900) Distribution: India to Vietnam
 Portia assamensis Wanless, 1978 Distribution: India to Malaysia
XLIII.av. Genus Pseudamycus Simon, 1885 
 Pseudamycus himalaya (Tikader, 1967) Comments: Endemic to India.
XLIII.aw. Genus Pseudicius Simon, 1885
 Pseudicius andamanius (Tikader, 1977) Comments: Endemic to Andaman & Nicobar Islands.
 Pseudicius daitaricus Prószyn’ski, 1992 Comments: Endemic to India
 Pseudicius frigidus (O.P.-Cambridge, 1885) Distribution: Afghanistan, Pakistan, India, China
 Pseudicius ludhianaensis (Tikader, 1974) Comments: Endemic to India.
 Pseudicius modestus Simon, 1885 Comments: Endemic to India
 Pseudicius nepalicus (Andreeva, Heciak & Prószyn’ski, 1984) Distribution:India, Nepal Comments: Endemic to South Asia
XLIII.ax. Genus Rhene Thorell, 1869
 Rhene albigera (C.L. Koch, 1846) Distribution: India to Sumatra
 Rhene callida Peckham & Peckham, 1895 Comments: Endemic to India
 Rhene callosa (Peckham & Peckham, 1895) Comments: Endemic to India
 Rhene citri (Sadana, 1991) Comments: Endemic to India
 Rhene daitarensis Prószyn’ski, 1992 Comments: Endemic to India
 Rhene danieli Tikader, 1973 Comments: Endemic to India
 Rhene darjeelingiana Prószyn’ski, 1992 Comments: Endemic to India
 Rhene decorata Tikader, 1977 Synonym: Rhene decoratus Tikader, 1977 Comments: Endemic to India.
 Rhene flavicomans Simon, 1902 Distribution: India, Bhutan, Sri Lanka Comments: Endemic to South Asia
 Rhene haldanei Gajbe, 2004 Comments: Endemic to India
 Rhene indica Tikader, 1973 Distribution: India, China
 Rhene khandalaensis Tikader, 1977 Comments: Endemic to India
 Rhene mus (Simon, 1889) Comments: Endemic to India
 Rhene pantharae Biswas & Biswas, 1992 Comments: Endemic to India
 Rhene sanghrakshiti Gajbe, 2004 Comments: Endemic to India
 Rhene rubrigera (Thorell, 1887) Distribution: India to China, Sumatra
XLIII.ay. Genus Saitis Simon, 1876 
 Saitis chaperi Simon, 1885 Distribution: India, Sri Lanka Comments: Endemic to South Asia
XLIII.az. Genus Similaria Prószyn’ski, 1992 Comments: Monotypic Genus and endemic to India.
 Similaria enigmatica Prószyn’ski, 1992 Comments: Endemic to India
XLIII.ba. Genus Sitticus Simon, 1901 
 Sitticus diductus (O.P.-Cambridge, 1885) Distribution: India, China
XLIII.bb. Genus Stenaelurillus Simon, 1885 
 Stenaelurillus lesserti Reimoser, 1934 Comments: Endemic to India
XLIII.bc Genus Telamonia Thorell, 1887
 Telamonia dimidiata (Simon, 1899) Distribution: India, Bhutan, Sumatra
 Telamonia peckhami Thorell, 1891 Comments: Endemic to Andaman & Nicobar Islands.
 Telamonia sikkimensis (Tikader, 1967) Comments: Endemic to India.
XLIII.bd. Genus Thiania C. L. Koch, 1846 
 Thiania bhamoensis Thorell, 1887 Distribution: Myanmar to Sumatra
XLIII.be. Genus Thyene Simon, 1885 
 Thyene imperialis (Rossi, 1846) Distribution: Old World
XLIII.bf. Genus Viciria Thorell, 1877
 Viciria diademata Simon, 1902 Comments: Endemic to India
 Viciria diatreta Simon, 1902 Comments: Endemic to India
 Viciria minima Reimoser, 1934 Comments: Endemic to India
XLIII.bg. Genus Yaginumaella Prószyn’ski, 1979 
 Yaginumaella senchalensis Prószyn’ski, 1992 Comments: Endemic to India
XLIII.bh. Genus Yllenus Simon, 1868
 Yllenus baltistanus Caporiacco, 1935 Comments: Endemic to India
 Yllenus karnai Logunov & Marusik, 2003 Comments: Endemic to India
XLIII.bi. Genus Zeuxippus Thorell, 1891 
 Zeuxippus histrio Thorell, 1891 Comments: Endemic to India

XLIV. Family Scytodidae Blackwall, 1864
XLIV.a. Genus Scytodes Latreille, 1804
 Scytodes alfredi Gajbe, 2004 Comments: Endemic to India
 Scytodes fusca Walckenaer, 1837 Distribution: Pantropical
 Scytodes gilva (Thorell, 1887) Distribution: India, Myanmar
 Scytodes kinsukus Patel, 1975 Comments: Endemic to India
 Scytodes mawphlongensis Tikader, 1966 Comments: Endemic to India
 Scytodes pallida Doleschall, 1859 Distribution: India, China, Philippines, New Guinea
 Scytodes propinqua Stoliczka, 1869 Comments: Endemic to India
 Scytodes stoliczkai Simon, 1897 Comments: Endemic to India.
 Scytodes thoracica (Latreille, 1802) Distribution: Holarctic, Pacific Island

XLV. Family Segestriidae Simon, 1893
XLV.a. Genus Ariadna Audouin, 1826 
 Ariadna nebulosa Simon, 1906 Comments: Endemic to India
XLV.b. Genus Segestria Latreille, 1804 
 Segestria inda Simon, 1906 Comments: Endemic to India

XLVI. Family Selenopidae Simon, 1897
XLVI.a. Genus Selenops Latreille, 1819
 Selenops agumbensis Tikader, 1969 Comments: Endemic to India
 Selenops montigenus Simon, 1889 Comments: Endemic to India
 Selenops nilgirensis Reimoser, 1934 Comments: Endemic to India
 Selenops radiatus Latreille, 1819 Distribution: Mediterranean, Africa, India, Myanmar
 Selenops shevaroyensis Gravely, 1931 Comments: Endemic to India
 Selenops sumitrae Patel & Patel, 1973 Comments: Endemic to India

XLVII. Family Sicariidae Keyserling, 1880
XLVII.a. Genus Loxosceles Heineken & Lowe, 1832 
 Loxosceles rufescens (Dufour, 1820) Distribution: Cosmopolitan

XLVIII. Family Sparassidae Bertkau, 1872
XLVIII.a. Genus Bhutaniella Jäger, 2000 Comments: Endemic to South Asia.
 Bhutaniella sikkimensis (Gravely, 1931) Comments: Endemic to India.
XLVIII.b. Genus Gnathopalystes Rainbow, 1899
 Gnathopalystes kochi (Simon, 1880) Distribution: India, Myanmar, Malaysia, Java, Sumatra, Borneo
XLVIII.c. Genus Heteropoda Latreille, 1804 
 Heteropoda afghana Roewer, 1962 Distribution: Afghanistan, Pakistan, India
 Heteropoda altithorax Strand, 1907 Comments: Endemic to India
 Heteropoda andamanensis Tikader, 1977 Comments: Endemic to Andaman & Nicobar Islands
 Heteropoda bhaikakai Patel & Patel, 1973 Comments: Endemic to India
 Heteropoda buxa Saha, Biswas & Raychaudhuri, 1995 Comments: Endemic to India.
 Heteropoda emarginativulva Strand, 1907 Comments: Endemic to India
 Heteropoda fabrei Simon, 1885 Comments: Endemic to India
 Heteropoda fischeri Jäger, 2005 Comments: Endemic to India
 Heteropoda gourae Monga, Sadana & Singh, 1988 Comments: Endemic to India
 Heteropoda hampsoni Pocock, 1901 Comments: Endemic to India
 Heteropoda kandiana Pocock, 1899 Distribution: India, Sri Lanka Comments:Endemic to South Asia
 Heteropoda kuluensis Sethi & Tikader, 1988 Comments: Endemic to India
 Heteropoda lentula Pocock, 1901 Comments: Endemic to India
 Heteropoda leprosa Simon, 1884 Distribution: India, Myanmar, Malaysia
 Heteropoda lunula (Doleschall, 1857) Distribution: India to Vietnam, Malaysia, Java, Sumatra, Borneo
 Heteropoda malitiosa Simon, 1906 Comments: Endemic to India
 Heteropoda merkarensis Strand, 1907 Comments: Endemic to India
 Heteropoda nicobarensis Tikader, 1977 Comments: Endemic to Andaman & Nicobar Islands
 Heteropoda nilgirina Pocock, 1901 Comments: Endemic to India
 Heteropoda nirounensis (Simon, 1903) Distribution: India, Sumatra
 Heteropoda pedata Strand, 1907 Comments: Endemic to India
 a.    H. pedata magna Strand,1909 Comments: Endemic to India
 Heteropoda phasma Simon, 1897 Comments: Endemic to India
 Heteropoda robusta Fage, 1924 Comments: Endemic to India
 Heteropoda rufognatha Strand, 1907 Comments: Endemic to India
 Heteropoda sexpunctata Simon, 1885 Distribution: India, Malaysia
 Heteropoda shillongensis Sethi & Tikader, 1988 Comments: Endemic to India
 Heteropoda straminiosa Kundu, Biswas & Raychaudhuri, 1999 Comments: Endemic to India
 Heteropoda striatipes (Leardi, 1902) Comments: Endemic to India
 Heteropoda subplebeia Strand, 1907 Comments: Endemic to India
 Heteropoda veiliana Strand, 1907 Comments: Endemic to India
 Heteropoda venatoria (Linnaeus, 1767) Distribution: Pantropical
 Heteropoda warthiana Strand, 1907 Comments: Endemic to India
XLVIII.d. Genus Olios Walckenaer, 1837
 Olios admiratus (Pocock, 1901) Comments: Endemic to India.
 Olios bhavnagarensis Sethi & Tikader, 1988 Comments: Endemic to India
 Olios fuligineus (Pocock, 1901) Comments: Endemic to India.
 Olios gravelyi Sethi & Tikader, 1988 Comments: Endemic to India
 Olios hampsoni (Pocock, 1901) Comments: Endemic to India.
 Olios iranii (Pocock, 1901) Distribution: India, Pakistan comments: Endemic to South Asia.
 Olios kiranae Sethi & Tikader, 1988 Comments: Endemic to India
 Olios lamarcki (Latreille, 1806) Distribution: Madagascar to Sri Lanka, India
 Olios milleti (Pocock, 1901) Distribution: India, Sri Lanka Comments: Endemic to South Asia.
 Olios obesulus (Pocock, 1901) Comments: Endemic to India.
 Olios patagiatus (Simon, 1897) Comments: Endemic to India.
 Olios phipsoni (Pocock, 1899) Comments: Endemic to India.
 Olios pyrozonis (Pocock, 1901) Comments: Endemic to India.
 Olios rosettii (Leardi, 1901) Comments: Endemic to India
 Olios rotundiceps (Pocock, 1901) Comments: Endemic to India.
 Olios sanguinifrons (Simon, 1906) Comments: Endemic to India.
 Olios senilis Simon, 1880 Distribution: India, Sri Lanka Comments: Endemic to South Asia.
 Olios stimulator (Simon, 1897) Comments: Endemic to India.
 Olios striatus (Blackwall, 1867) Comments: Endemic to India.
 Olios tarandus (Simon, 1897) Comments: Endemic to India.
 Olios tener (Thorell, 1891) Distribution: Pakistan, India, Myanmar
 Olios tikaderi Kundu, Biswas & Raychaudhuri, 1999 Comments: Endemic to India
 Olios wroughtoni (Simon, 1897) Comments: Endemic to India.
 Olios xerxes (Pocock, 1901) Distribution: Iran to India
XLVIII.e. Genus Palystes L. Koch, 1875 
 Palystes flavidus Simon, 1897 Comments: Endemic to India
XLVIII.f. Genus Pandercetes L. Koch, 1875
 Pandercetes celatus Pocock, 1899 Comments: Endemic to India
 Pandercetes decipiens Pocock, 1899 Distribution: India, Sri Lanka Comments: Endemic to South Asia
XLVIII.g. Genus Pseudopoda Jäger, 2000
 Pseudopoda abnormis Jäger, 2001 Comments: Endemic to India
 Pseudopoda akashi (Sethi & Tikader, 1988) Comments: Endemic to India.
 Pseudopoda casaria (Simon, 1897) Comments: Endemic to India
 Pseudopoda hingstoni Jäger, 2001 Comments: Endemic to India
 Pseudopoda lutea (Thorell, 1895) Distribution: India, Myanmar
 Pseudopoda minor Jäger, 2001 Comments: Endemic to India
 Pseudopoda prompta (O.P.-Cambridge, 1885) Distribution: India, Pakistan Comments: Endemic to South Asia.
XLVIII.h. Genus Seramba Thorell, 1887 
 Seramba bifasciata Thorell, 1891 Comments: Endemic to Andaman & Nicobar Islands
XLVIII.i. Genus Spariolenus Simon, 1880
 Spariolenus megalopis Thorell, 1891 Comments: Endemic to Andaman & Nicobar Islands
 Spariolenus minusculus (Reimoser, 1934) Comments: Endemic to India.
 Spariolenus tigris Simon, 1880 Distribution: India, Pakistan, Malaysia
XLVIII.j. Genus Thelcticopis Karsch, 1884
 Thelcticopis ajax Pocock, 1901 Comments: Endemic to India
 Thelcticopis bicornuta Pocock, 1901 Comments: Endemic to India
 Thelcticopis canescens Simon, 1887Distribution: India, Myanmar
 Thelcticopis maindroni Simon, 1906 Comments: Endemic to India
 Thelcticopis rufula Pocock, 1901 Comments: Endemic to India
 Thelcticopis serambiformis Strand, 1907 Comments: Endemic to India
 Thelcticopis virescens Pocock, 1901 Comments: Endemic to India

XLIX. Family Stenochilidae Thorell, 1873
XLIX.a. Genus Stenochilus O. P.-Cambridge, 1870
 Stenochilus hobsoni O. P.-Cambridge, 1870 Comments: Endemic to India
 Stenochilus scutulatus Platnick & Shadab, 1974 Comments: Endemic to India

L. Family Tetrablemmidae O.P.-cambridge, 1873
L.a. Genus Brignoliella Shear, 1978
 Brignoliella besuchetiana Bourne, 1980 Comments: Endemic to India
L.b. Genus Choiroblemma Bourne, 1980 Comments: Endemic to India.
 Choiroblemma bengalense Bourne, 1980 Comments: Endemic to India
 Choiroblemma rhinoxunum Bourne, 1980 Comments: Endemic to India
L.c. Genus Indicoblemma Bourne, 1980 Comments: Monotypic Genus and endemic to India.
 Indicoblemma sheari Bourne, 1980 Comments: Endemic to India
L.d. Genus Tetrablemma O. P.-Cambridge, 1873
 Tetrablemma brignolii Lehtinen, 1981 Comments: Endemic to India
 Tetrablemma deccanense (Tikader, 1976) Comments: Endemic to India.
 Tetrablemma loebli Bourne, 1980 Comments: Endemic to India
 Tetrablemma medioculatum O. P.-Cambridge, 1873 Comments: Endemic to South Asia
 a. T. medioculatum cochinense Lehtinen, 1981 Comments: Endemic to India
 b. T. medioculatum gangeticum Lehtinen, 1981 Comments: Endemic to India

LI. Family Tetragnathidae Menge, 1866
LI.a. Genus Guizygiella Zhu, Kim & Song, 1997 
 Guizygiella melanocrania(Thorell, 1887) Distribution: India to China
LI.b. Genus Herennia Thorell, 1877

 Herennia ornatissima (Doleschall, 1859) Distribution: India to China, Malaysia, New Guinea
LI.c. Genus Leucauge White, 1841
 Leucauge argentata (O. P.-Cambridge, 1869) Distribution: India, Sri Lanka, New Guinea
 Leucauge beata (Pocock, 1901) Comments: Endemic to India.
 Leucauge bengalensis Gravely, 1921 Comments: Endemic to India.
 Leucauge celebesiana (Walckenaer, 1842) Distribution: India to China, Japan, Sulawesi, New Guinea
 Leucauge decorata (Blackwall, 1864) Distribution: Paleotropical
 Leucauge dorsotuberculata Tikader, 1982 Comments: Endemic to India
 Leucauge nicobarica (Thorell, 1891) Comments: Endemic to Andaman & Nicobar Islands
 Leucauge pondae Tikader, 1970 Comments: Endemic to India
 Leucauge pusilla (Thorell, 1878) Distribution: India, Amboina
 Leucauge rubrotrivittata Simon, 1906 Comments: Endemic to India

 Leucauge tessellata (Thorell, 1887) Distribution: India to Moluccas, Taiwan
 Leucauge tristicta (Thorell, 1891) Comments: Endemic to Andaman & Nicobar Islands
Genus Mesida Kulczyński, 1911
 Mesida culta (O. P.-Cambridge, 1869) Distribution: India, Sri Lanka Comments: Endemic to South Asia.
LI.d.  Genus Meta C. L. Koch, 1836
 Meta abdomenalis Patel & Reddy, 1993 Comments: Endemic to India
 Meta simlaensis Tikader, 1982 Comments: Endemic to India
LI.e. Genus Nephila Leach, 1815
 Nephila clavata L. Koch, 1878 Distribution: India to Japan
 Nephila kuhlii (Doleschall, 1859) Distribution: India to Sulawesi
 Nephila pilipes (Fabricius, 1793) Distribution: China, Philippines to Australia
 N. pilipes jalorensis (Simon, 1901) Comments: Endemic to India
 Nephila robusta Tikader, 1962 Comments: Endemic to India
LI.f. Genus Nephilengys L. Koch, 1872 
 Nephilengys malabarensis (Walckenaer, 1842) Distribution: India to Philippines, Australia
LI.g. Genus Opadometa Archer, 1951
 Opadometa fastigata (Simon, 1877) Distribution: India to Philippines, Sulawesi
LI.h. Genus Orsinome Thorell, 1890
 Orsinome armata Pocock, 1901 Comments: Endemic to India
 Orsinome listeri Gravely, 1921 Comments: Endemic to India
 Orsinome marmorea Pocock, 1901 Comments: Endemic to India
LI.i. Genus Pachygnatha Sundevall, 1823
 Pachygnatha silentvalliensis Biswas and Roy, 2004 Comments: Endemic to India
LI.j. Genus Phonognatha Simon, 1894 
 Phonognatha vicitra Sherriffs, 1928 – misidentified; now Acusilas coccineus
LI.k. Genus Tetragnatha Latreille, 1804 
 Tetragnatha andamanensis Tikader, 1977 Comments: Endemic to Andaman & Nicobar Islands
 Tetragnatha bengalensis Walckenaer, 1842 Comments: Endemic to India
 Tetragnatha chamberlini (Gajbe, 2004) Comments: Endemic to India
 Tetragnatha ceylonica O. P.-Cambridge, 1869 Distribution: South Africa, Sri Lanka to Philippines, New Britain
 Tetragnatha cochinensis Gravely, 1921 Comments: Endemic to India
 Tetragnatha coelestis Pocock, 1901 Comments: Endemic to India
 Tetragnatha delumbis Thorell, 1891 Comments: Endemic to Andaman & Nicobar Islands
 Tetragnatha fletcheri Gravely, 1921 Comments: Endemic to India
 Tetragnatha foliferens Hingston, 1927 Comments: Endemic to Andaman & Nicobar Islands
 Tetragnatha foveata Karsch, 1891 Distribution: India, Sri Lanka, Maldives Comments: Endemic to South Asia
 Tetragnatha geniculata Karsch, 1891 Distribution: Sri Lanka to Thailand
 Tetragnatha iridescens Stoliczka, 1869 Comments: Endemic to India
 Tetragnatha isidis (Simon, 1880) Distribution: Europe to Sumatra
 Tetragnatha javana (Thorell, 1890) Distribution: Africa to Japan, Philippines, Indonesia
 Tetragnatha mandibulata Walckenaer, 1842 Distribution: West Africa, India to Philippines, Australia
 Tetragnatha maxillosa Thorell, 1895 Distribution: South Africa, India to Philippines, New Hebrides
 Tetragnatha paradisea Pocock, 1901 Comments: Endemic to India
 Tetragnatha parvula Thorell, 1891 Comments: Endemic to Andaman & Nicobar Islands
 Tetragnatha sutherlandi Gravely, 1921 Comments: Endemic to India
 Tetragnatha tenera Thorell, 1881 Distribution: India, Sri Lanka, Queensland
 Tetragnatha vermiformis Emerton, 1884 Distribution: India, USA to Panama, Southern Africa to Japan, Philippines
 Tetragnatha viridorufa Gravely, 1921 Comments: Endemic to India
LI.l. Genus Tylorida Simon, 1894
 Tylorida ventralis (Thorell, 1877) Distribution: India to Taiwan, New Guinea

LII. Family Theraphosidae Thorell, 1870
LII.a. Genus Annandaliella Hirst, 1909 Comments: Endemic to India.
 Annandaliella pectinifera Gravely, 1935 Comments: Endemic to India

 Annandaliella travancorica Hirst, 1909 Comments: Endemic to India
LII.b. Genus Chilobrachys Karsch, 1891
 Chilobrachys andersoni (Pocock, 1895) Distribution: India, Myanmar, Malaysia
 Chilobrachys assamensis Hirst, 1909 Comments: Endemic to India
 Chilobrachys femoralis Pocock, 1900 Comments: Endemic to India
 Chilobrachys fimbriatus Pocock, 1899 Comments: Endemic to India
 Chilobrachys flavopilosus (Simon, 1884) Distribution: India, Myanmar
 Chilobrachys fumosus (Pocock, 1895) Comments: Endemic to India
 Chilobrachys hardwicki (Pocock, 1895) Comments: Endemic to India
 Chilobrachys stridulans (Wood Mason, 1877) Comments: Endemic to India.
 Chilobrachys thorelli Pocock, 1900 Comments: Endemic to India
LII.c. Genus Haploclastus Simon, 1892 
 Haploclastus cervinus Simon, 1892 Comments: Endemic to India
 Haploclastus himalayensis (Tikader, 1977) Comments: Endemic to India
 Haploclastus kayi Gravely, 1915 Comments: Endemic to India
 Haploclastus nilgirinus Pocock, 1899 Comments: Endemic to India
 Haploclastus robustus (Pocock, 1899) Comments: Endemic to India
 Haploclastus satyanus (Barman, 1978) Comments: Endemic to India
 Haploclastus tenebrosus Gravely, 1935 Comments: Endemic to India
 Haploclastus validus (Pocock, 1899) Comments: Endemic to India
LII.d. Genus Ischnocolus Ausserer, 1871 
 Ischnocolus decoratus Tikader, 1977 Comments: Endemic to India.
 Ischnocolus khasiensis Tikader, 1977 Comments: Endemic to India
LII.e. Genus Lyrognathus Pocock, 1895
 Lyrognathus crotalus Pocock, 1895 Comments: Endemic to India
 Lyrognathus pugnax Pocock, 1900
 Lyrognathus saltator Pocock, 1900 Comments: Endemic to India
LII.f. Genus Phlogiellus Pocock, 1897 
 Phlogiellus subarmatus (Thorell, 1891) Comments: Endemic to Andaman & Nicobar Islands.
LII.g. Genus Plesiophrictus Pocock, 1899 
 Plesiophrictus bhori Gravely, 1915 Comments: Endemic to India
 Plesiophrictus blatteri Gravely, 1935 Comments: Endemic to India
 Plesiophrictus collinus Pocock, 1899 Comments: Endemic to India
 Plesiophrictus fabrei (Simon, 1892) Comments: Endemic to India
 Plesiophrictus linteatus (Simon, 1891)Comments: Endemic to India
 Plesiophrictus madraspatanus Gravely, 1935 Comments: Endemic to India
 Plesiophrictus mahabaleshwari Tikader, 1977 Comments: Endemic to India
 Plesiophrictus meghalayaensis Tikader, 1977 Comments: Endemic to India
 Plesiophrictus millardi Pocock, 1899 Comments: Endemic to India
 Plesiophrictus milleti (Pocock, 1900) Comments: Endemic to India
 Plesiophrictus raja Gravely, 1915 Comments: Endemic to India
 Plesiophrictus satarensis Gravely, 1915 Comments: Endemic to India
 Plesiophrictus sericeus Pocock, 1900 Comments: Endemic to India
LII.h. Genus Poecilotheria Simon, 1885 Comments: Endemic to South Asia.
 Poecilotheria formosa (Pocock, 1899) Comments: Endemic to India
 Poecilotheria hanumavilasumica (Smith, 2004) Comments: Native to India and Sri Lanka
 Poecilotheria metallica (Pocock, 1899) Comments: Endemic to India
 Poecilotheria miranda (Pocock, 1900) Comments: Endemic to India
 Poecilotheria regalis (Pocock, 1899) Comments: Endemic to India
 Poecilotheria rufilata (Pocock, 1899) Comments: Endemic to India
 Poecilotheria striata (Pocock, 1895) Comments: Endemic to India.
 Poecilotheria tigrinawesseli (Smith, 2006) Comments: Endemic to India.
LII.i. Genus Selenocosmia Ausserer, 1871
 Selenocosmia himalayana Pocock, 1899 Comments: Endemic to India
 Selenocosmia javanensis (Walckenaer, 1837) Distribution: India, Malaysia to Sulawesi
 Selenocosmia kulluensis Chamberlin, 1917 Comments: Endemic to India
 Selenocosmia sutherlandi Gravely, 1935 Comments: Endemic to India
LII.j. Genus Thrigmopoeus Pocock, 1899 Comments: Endemic to India.
 Thrigmopoeus insignis Pocock, 1899 Comments: Endemic to India
 Thrigmopoeus truculentus Pocock, 1899 Comments: Endemic to India.

LIII. Family Theridiidae Sundevall, 1833
LIII.a. Genus Achaearanea Strand, 1929
 Achaearanea budana Tikader, 1970 Comments: Endemic to India
 Achaearanea diglipuriensis Tikader, 1977 Comments: Endemic to Andaman & Nicobar Islands
 Achaearanea durgae Tikader, 1970 Comments: Endemic to India
 Achaearanea mundula (L. Koch, 1872) Distribution: India to New Caledonia
 Achaearanea triangularis Patel nom. nov. 2003 Comments: Endemic to India
LIII.b. Genus Argyrodes Simon, 1864 
 Argyrodes ambalikae Tikader, 1970 Comments: Endemic to India
 Argyrodes andamanensis Tikader, 1977 Comments: Endemic to Andaman & Nicobar Islands
 Argyrodes chiriatapuensis Tikader, 1977 Comments: Endemic to Andaman & Nicobar Islands
 Argyrodes cyrtophorae Tikader, 1963 Synonym: Argyrodes cyrtophore Tikader, 1963 Comments: Endemic to India
 Argyrodes dipali Tikader, 1963 Comments: Endemic to India
 Argyrodes fissifrons O.P.-Cambridge, 1869 Distribution: India, Sri Lanka to China, Australia
 a. A. fissifrons terressae Thorell, 1891 Comments: Endemic to Andaman & Nicobar Islands
 Argyrodes flagellum (Doleschall, 1857) Distribution: India, Pakistan, Singapore, Australia
 Argyrodes gazedes Tikader, 1970 Comments: Endemic to India
 Argyrodes gazingensis Tikader, 1970 Comments: Endemic to India
 Argyrodes gouri Tikader, 1963 Comments: Endemic to India
 Argyrodes jamkhedes Tikader, 1963 Comments: Endemic to India
 Argyrodes projeles Tikader, 1970 Comments: Endemic to India
 Argyrodes scintillulanus O. P.-Cambridge, 1880 Distribution: India, Sri Lanka Comments: Endemic to South Asia
LIII.c. Genus Ariamnes Thorell, 1869 
 Ariamnes pavesii Leardi, 1902 Distribution: India, Sri Lanka Comments: Endemic to South Asia.
 Ariamnes simulans O. P.-Cambridge, 1892 Comments: Endemic to India.
LIII.d. Genus Chrysso O.P.-Cambridge, 1882 
  Chrysso picturata (Simon, 1895) Comments: Endemic to India
LIII.e. Genus Cyllognatha L. Koch, 1872 
  Cyllognatha surajbe Patel & Patel, 1972 Comments: Endemic to India
LIII.f. Genus Euryopis Menge, 1868 
  Euryopis nubila Simon, 1889 Comments: Endemic to India
LIII.g.  Genus Faiditus Keyserling, 1884 
  Faiditus xiphias Thorell, 1887 Distribution: Myanmar, India to Japan, Krakatau
LIII.h. Genus Latrodectus Walckenaer, 1805 
  Latrodectus hasselti Thorell, 1870 Distribution: India, Southeast Asia to Australia, New Zealand
LIII.i.  Genus Moneta O.P.-Cambridge, 1870 
  Moneta grandis Simon, 1905 Comments: Endemic to India
LIII.j. Genus Phoroncidia Westwood, 1835 
 Phoroncidia aculeata Westwood, 1835 Comments: Endemic to India
 Phoroncidia maindroni (Simon, 1905) Comments: Endemic to India
 Phoroncidia testudo (O.P.-Cambridge, 1873) Distribution: India, Sri Lanka Comments: Endemic to South Asia
LIII.k. Genus Phycosoma O.P.-Cambridge, 1879 
 Phycosoma martinae (Roberts, 1983) Distribution: India, Aldabra, China, Korea, Ryūkyū Is., Philippines
LIII.l. Genus Propostira Simon, 1894 Comment: Endemic to South Asia.
 Propostira quadrangulata Simon, 1894 Distribution: India, Sri Lanka Comments: Endemic to South Asia
 Propostira ranii Bhattacharya, 1935 Comments: Endemic to India
LIII.m. Genus Rhomphaea L. Koch, 1872 
 Rhomphaea projiciens (O.P.-Cambridge, 1896) Distribution: USA to Argentina, India
LIII.n.  Genus Steatoda Sundevall, 1833
 Steatoda alboclathrata (Simon, 1897) Comments: Endemic to India
 Steatoda albomaculata (De Geer, 1778) Distribution: Cosmopolitan
 Steatoda rufoannulata (Simon, 1899) Distribution: India, Sri Lanka, Sumatra, Java
LIII.o. Genus Theridion Walckenaer, 1805
 Theridion incertum O.P.-Cambridge, 1885 Comments: Endemic to India
 Theridion indicum Tikader, 1977 Comments: Endemic to Andaman & Nicobar Islands
 Theridion leucophaeum Simon, 1905 Comments: Endemic to India
 Theridion maindroni Simon, 1905 Comments: Endemic to India
 Theridion manjithar Tikader, 1970 Comments: Endemic to India.
 Theridion nilgherinum Simon, 1905 Comments: Endemic to India
 Theridion piligerum Frauenfeld, 1867 Comments: Endemic to Andaman & Nicobar Islands
 Theridion sadani Monga & Singh, 1989 Comments: Endemic to India
 Theridion spinosissimum Caporiacco, 1934 Comments: Endemic to India.
 Theridion subitum O.P.-Cambridge, 1885 Comments: Endemic to India
 Theridion subvittatum Simon, 1889 Comments: Endemic to India
 Theridion tikaderi Patel, 1973 Comments: Endemic to India
LIII.p. Genus Theridula Emerton, 1882
 Theridula angula Tikader, 1970 Comments: Endemic to India
 Theridula swatiae Biswas, Saha & Raychaudhuri, 1997 Comments: Endemic to India
LIII.q. Genus Thwaitesia O.P.-Cambridge, 1881 
 Thwaitesia dangensis Patel & Patel, 1972 Comments: Endemic to India
LIII.r. Genus Tomoxena Simon, 1895 
 Tomoxena dives Simon, 1895 Comments: Endemic to India

LIV. Family Theridiosomatidae Simon, 1881
LIV.a. Genus Wendilgarda Keyserling, 1886 
 Wendilgarda assamensis Fage, 1924 Distribution: India, China

LV. Family Thomisidae Sundevall, 1833
LV.a. Genus Amyciaea Simon, 1885 
 Amyciaea forticeps (O.P.-Cambridge, 1873) Distribution: India, China  to Malaysia
LV.b. Genus Angaeus Thorell, 1881 
 Angaeus pentagonalis Pocock, 1901 Endemic to India.
LV.c. Genus Bomis L. Koch, 1874
 Bomis bengalensis Tikader, 1962 Comments: Endemic to India
 Bomis calcuttaensis Biswas & Mazumder, 1981 Comments: Endemic to India
 Bomis khajuriai Tikader, 1980 Comments: Endemic to India
LV.d. Genus Borboropactus Simon, 1884 
 Borboropactus elephantus (Tikader, 1966) Comments: Endemic to India.
LV.e. Genus Camaricus Thorell, 1887
 Camaricus bipunctatus Bastawade, 2002 Endemic to India. Genus misspelled in original description.
 Camaricus formosus Thorell, 1887 Distribution: India to Sumatra, China, Philippines
 Camaricus khandalaensis Tikader, 1980 Comments: Endemic to India
 Camaricus maugei (Walckenaer, 1837) Distribution: India to Vietnam, Sumatra, Java, Krakatau
LV.f. Genus Demogenes Simon, 1895
 Demogenes andamanensis (Tikader, 1980) Comments: Endemic to Andaman & Nicobar Islands.
LV.g. Genus Diaea Thorell, 1869
 Diaea bengalensis Biswas & Majumder, 1981 Comments: Endemic to India
 Diaea pougneti Simon, 1885 Comments: Endemic to India
 Diaea subdola O.P.-Cambridge, 1885 Distribution: Russia, India, Pakistan to Japan
LV.h. Genus Dietopsa Strand, 1932 Comments: Endemic to India.
 Dietopsa castaneifrons (Simon, 1895) Comments: Endemic to India
 Dietopsa parnassia (Simon, 1895) Comments: Endemic to India.
LV.i. Genus Ebrechtella Dahl, 1907 
 Ebrechtella concinna (Thorell, 1877) Distribution: Pakistan, India to Philippines, Sulawesi, New Guinea
LV.j. Genus Epidius Thorell, 1877 
 Epidius longipalpis Thorell, 1877 Distribution: India, Sri Lanka, Java, Sumatra, Ceram, Sulawesi
LV.k. Genus Henriksenia Lehtinen, 2005
 Henriksenia hilaris (Thorell, 1877) Distribution: India to Philippines, Sulawesi, New Guinea
LV.l. Genus Heriaeus Simon, 1875
 Heriaeus horridus Tyschchenko, 1965 Distribution: India, Russia, Central Asia
LV.m. Genus Holopelus Simon, 1886 
 Holopelus malati Simon, 1895 Comments: Endemic to India
LV.n. Genus Loxobates Thorell, 1877
 Loxobates castetsi (Simon, 1906) Comments: Endemic to India.
 Loxobates kapuri (Tikader, 1980) Comments: Endemic to India.
LV.o. Genus Lycopus Thorell, 1895 
 Lycopus trabeatus Simon, 1895 Comments: Endemic to India
LV.p. Genus Lysiteles Simon, 1895
 Lysiteles brunettii (Tikader, 1962) Comments: Endemic to India.
 Lysiteles catulus Simon, 1895 Comments: Endemic to India
 Lysiteles excultus (O.P.-Cambridge, 1885) Distribution: India, Pakistan Comments: Endemic to South Asia.
 Lysiteles mandali (Tikader, 1966) Distribution: India, China
LV.q. Genus Massuria Thorell, 1887 
 Massuria roonwali (Basu, 1964) Comments: Endemic to India.
 Massuria sreepanchamii (Tikader, 1962) Comments: Endemic to India.
LV.r. Genus Mastira Thorell, 1891
 Mastira menoka (Tikader, 1963) Comments: Endemic to India.
 Mastira nicobarensis (Tikader, 1980) Comments: Endemic to Andaman & Nicobar Islands.
LV.s. Genus Misumena Latreille, 1804
 Misumena annapurna Tikader, 1963 Comments: Endemic to India
 Misumena ganpatii Kumari & Mittal, 1994 Comments: Endemic to India
 Misumena greenae Tikader, 1965 Comments: Endemic to India
 Misumena indra Tikader, 1963 Comments: Endemic to India
 Misumena mridulai Tikader, 1962 Comments: Endemic to India
LV.t. Genus Misumenoides F.O.P.-Cambridge, 1900 
 Misumenoides gwarighatensis Gajbe, 2004 Comments: Endemic to India
LV.u. Genus Misumenops F.O.P.-Cambridge, 1900 
 Misumenops khandalaensis Tikader, 1965 Comments: Endemic to India
LV.v. Genus Monaeses Thorell, 1869
 Monaeses jabalpurensis Gajbe & Rane, 1992 Comments: Endemic to India
 Monaeses mukundi Tikader, 1980 Comments: Endemic to India
 Monaeses pachpediensis (Tikader, 1980) Comments: Endemic to India.
 Monaeses parvati Tikader, 1963 Comments: Endemic to India
LV.w. Genus Oxytate L. Koch, 1878 
 Oxytate chlorion (Simon, 1906) Comments: Endemic to India
 Oxytate elongata (Tikader, 1980) Comments: Endemic to India
 Oxytate greenae (Tikader, 1980) Comments: Endemic to Andaman & Nicobar Islands
 Oxytate virens (Thorell, 1891) Distribution: India, Vietnam, Singapore
LV.x. Genus Ozyptila Simon, 1864 
 Ozyptila amkhasensis Tikader, 1980 Comments: Endemic to India
 Ozyptila chandosiensis Tikader, 1980 Comments: Endemic to India
 Ozyptila jabalpurensis Bhandari & Gajbe, 2001 Comments: Endemic to India
 Ozyptila khasi Tikader, 1961 Comments: Endemic to India
 Ozyptila manii Tikader, 1961 Comments: Endemic to India
 Ozyptila maratha Tikader, 1971 Comments: Endemic to India.
 Ozyptila reenae Basu, 1964 Comments: Endemic to India
 Ozyptila theobaldi Simon, 1885 Comments: Endemic to India
LV.y. Genus Pasias Simon, 1895
 Pasias marathas Tikader, 1965 Comments: Endemic to India
 Pasias puspagiri Tikader, 1963 Comments: Endemic to India
LV.z. Genus Phrynarachne Thorell, 1869
 Phrynarachne peeliana (Stoliczka, 1869) Comments: Endemic to India
 Phrynarachne tuberosa (Blackwall, 1864) Comments: Endemic to India
LV.aa. Genus Pistius Simon, 1875
 Pistius barchensis Basu, 1965 Comments: Endemic to India
 Pistius bhadurii Basu, 1965 Comments: Endemic to India
 Pistius gangulyi Basu, 1965 Distribution: India, China
 Pistius kalimpus Tikader, 1970 Comments: Endemic to India
 Pistius kanikae Basu, 1964 Comments: Endemic to India
 Pistius robustus Basu, 1965 Endemic to India
 Pistius tikaderi Kumari & Mittal, 1999 Comments: Endemic to India
LV.ab. Genus Platythomisus Doleschall, 1859 
 Platythomisus bazarus Tikader, 1970 Comments: Endemic to India
 Platythomisus sudeepi Biswas, 1977 Comments: Endemic to India
LV.ac. Genus Runcinia Simon, 1875
 Runcinia affinis Simon, 1897 Distribution: Africa, India to Japan, Philippines, Java
 Runcinia bifrons (Simon, 1895) Distribution: India, Sri Lanka, Vietnam
 Runcinia chauhani Sen & Basu, 1972 Comments: Endemic to India
 Runcinia escheri Reimoser, 1934 Comments: Endemic to India
 Runcinia ghorpadei Tikader, 1980 Comments: Endemic to India
 Runcinia khandari Gajbe, 2004 Comments: Endemic to India
 Runcinia kinbergi Thorell, 1891 Distribution: India, Myanmar, Java
 Runcinia roonwali Tikader, 1965 Comments: Endemic to India
 Runcinia sitadongri Gajbe, 2004 Comments: Endemic to India
 Runcinia spinulosa (O.P.-Cambridge, 1885) Distribution: Pakistan, India Comments: Endemic to South Asia.
 Runcinia yogeshi Gajbe & Gajbe, 2001 Comments: Endemic to India
 Runcinia sitadongri Gajbe, 2004 Comments: Endemic to India
LV.ad. Genus Stiphropus Gerstäcker, 1873
 Stiphropus duriusculus (Simon, 1885) Comments: Endemic to India
 Stiphropus soureni Sen, 1964 Distribution: India, Nepal, Bhutan Comments: Endemic to South Asia
LV.ae. Genus Strigoplus Simon, 1885
 Strigoplus bilobus Saha & Raychaudhuri, 2004 Comments: Endemic to India
 Strigoplus moluri Patel, 2003 Comments: Endemic to India
 Strigoplus netravati Tikader, 1963 Comments: Endemic to India
LV.af. Genus Synema Simon, 1864 
 Synema decoratum Tikader, 1960 Distribution: India, China
 Synema mysorense Tikader, 1980 Comments: Endemic to India
LV.ag. Genus Talaus Simon, 1886 
 Talaus opportunus (O.P.-Cambridge, 1873) Comments: Endemic to India
LV.ah. Genus Tharpyna L. Koch, 1874
 Tharpyna himachalensis Tikader & Biswas, 1979 Comments: Endemic to India
 Tharpyna indica Tikader & Biswas, 1979 Comments: Endemic to India
LV.ai. Genus Thomisus Walckenaer, 1805
 Thomisus andamanensis Tikader, 1980 Comments: Endemic to Andaman & Nicobar Islands
 Thomisus armillatus (Thorell, 1891) Comments: Endemic to Andaman & Nicobar Islands
 Thomisus baghdeoi Gajbe, 2004 Comments: Endemic to India
 Thomisus beautifularis Basu, 1965 Comments: Endemic to India
 Thomisus baghdeoi Gajbe, 2004 Comments: Endemic to India
 Thomisus bargi Gajbe, 2004 Comments: Endemic to India
 Thomisus bulani Tikader, 1960 Comments: Endemic to India
 Thomisus danieli Gajbe, 2004 Comments: Endemic to India
 Thomisus daradioides Simon, 1890 Distribution: South Africa to India
 Thomisus dhakuriensis Tikader, 1960 Comments: Endemic to India
 Thomisus dyali Kumari & Mittal, 1997 Comments: Endemic to India
 Thomisus elongatus Stoliczka, 1869 Endemic to India.
 Thomisus godavariae Reddy & Patel, 1992 Comments: Endemic to India
 Thomisus granulifrons Simon, 1906 Distribution: India, Sri Lanka Comments: Endemic to South Asia
 Thomisus katrajghatus Tikader, 1963 Comments: Endemic to India
 Thomisus kokiwadai Gajbe, 2004 Comments: Endemic to India
 Thomisus krishnae Reddy & Patel, 1992 Comments: Endemic to India
 Thomisus leucaspis Simon, 1906 Distribution: India, New Caledonia
 Thomisus lobosus Tikader, 1965 Comments: Endemic to India
 Thomisus ludhianaensis Kumari & Mittal, 1997 Comments: Endemic to India
 Thomisus mimae Sen & Basu, 1963 Comments: Endemic to India
 Thomisus pateli Gajbe, 2004 Comments: Endemic to India
 Thomisus pathaki Gajbe, 2004 Comments: Endemic to India
 Thomisus pooneus Tikader, 1965 Comments: Endemic to India
 Thomisus projectus Tikader, 1960 Comments: Endemic to India
 Thomisus pugilis Stoliczka, 1869 Comments: Endemic to India
 Thomisus rajani Bhandari & Gajbe, 2001 Comments: Endemic to India
 Thomisus rigoratus Simon, 1906 Comments: Endemic to India
 Thomisus rishus Tikader, 1970 Comments: Endemic to India
 Thomisus shillongensis Sen, 1963 Comments: Endemic to India
 Thomisus shivajiensis Tikader, 1965 Comments: Endemic to India
 Thomisus sikkimensis Tikader, 1962 Comments: Endemic to India
 Thomisus simoni Gajbe, 2004 Comments: Endemic to India
 Thomisus sorajaii Basu, 1963 Comments: Endemic to India
 Thomisus spectabilis Doleschall, 1859  Distribution: India to Australia
 Thomisus sundari Gajbe & Gajbe, 2001 Comments: Endemic to India
 Thomisus viveki Gajbe, 2004 Comments: Endemic to India
 Thomisus whitakeri Gajbe, 2004 Comments: Endemic to India
LIV.aj. Genus Tmarus Simon, 1875
 Tmarus dejectus (O.P.-Cambridge, 1885) Endemic to India
 Tmarus fasciolatus Simon, 1906 Comments: Endemic to India
 Tmarus jabalpurensis Gajbe & Gajbe, 1999 Comments: Endemic to India
 Tmarus kotigeharus Tikader, 1963 Comments: Endemic to India
 Tmarus soricinus Simon, 1906 Comments: Endemic to India
LV.ak.  Genus Xysticus C.L. Koch, 1835
 Xysticus bengalensis Tikader & Biswas, 1974 Comments: Endemic to India
 Xysticus bharatae Gajbe & Gajbe, 1999 Comments: Endemic to India
 Xysticus breviceps O.P.-Cambridge, 1885 Comments: Endemic to India
 Xysticus croceus Fox, 1937 Distribution: India, Nepal, Bhutan, China, Korea, Japan
 Xysticus himalayaensis Tikader & Biswas, 1974 Comments: Endemic to India
 Xysticus hindusthanicus Basu, 1965 Comments: Endemic to India
 Xysticus jabalpurensis Gajbe & Gajbe, 1999 Comments: Endemic to India
 Xysticus jaharai Basu, 1979 Comments: Endemic to India
 Xysticus joyantius Tikader, 1966 Comments: Endemic to India
 Xysticus kali Tikader & Biswas, 1974 Comments: Endemic to India
 Xysticus kamakhyai Tikader, 1962 Comments: Endemic to India
 Xysticus kashidi Tikader, 1963 Comments: Endemic to India
 Xysticus khasiensis Tikader, 1980 Comments: Endemic to India
 Xysticus minutus Tikader, 1960 Comments: Endemic to India
 Xysticus pynurus Tikader, 1968 Comments: Endemic to India
 Xysticus roonwali Tikader, 1964 Distribution: India, Nepal Comments: Endemic to South Asia
 Xysticus setiger O.P.-Cambridge, 1885 Distribution: India, Pakistan Comments: Endemic to South Asia
 Xysticus shillongensis Tikader, 1962 Comments: Endemic to India
 Xysticus shyamrupus Tikader, 1966 Comments: Endemic to India
 Xysticus sikkimus Tikader, 1970 Distribution: India, China
 Xysticus tikaderi Bhandari & Gajbe, 2001 Comments: Endemic to India

LVI. Family Titanoecidae Lehtinen, 1967
LVI.a. Genus Anuvinda Lehtinen, 1967 Comments: Monotypic Genus and endemic to India.
 Anuvinda escheri (Reimoser, 1934) Endemic to India.

LVII. Family Trochanteriidae Karsch, 1879
LVII.a. Genus Plator Simon, 1880
 Plator himalayaensis Tikader & Gajbe, 1976 Comments: Endemic to India
 Plator indicus Simon, 1897 Synonym: Plator ixodinus Pocock, 1899 Endemic to India.
 Plator kashmirensis Tikader & Gajbe, 1973 Comments: Endemic to India
 Plator pandeae Tikader, 1969 Distribution: India, China
 Plator solanensis Tikader & Gajbe, 1976 Comments: Endemic to India

LVIII. Family Uloboridae Thorell, 1869
LVIII.a. Genus Hyptiotes Walckenaer, 1837
 Hyptiotes himalayensis Tikader, 1981 Comments: Endemic to India.
 Hyptiotes indicus Simon, 1905 Comments: Endemic to India
LVIII.b. Genus Miagrammopes O. P.-Cambridge, 1870
 Miagrammopes albomaculatus Thorell, 1891 Comments: Endemic to Andaman & Nicobar Islands
 Miagrammopes extensus Simon, 1889 Synonym: Miagrammopes extensa Simon, 1889 Endemic to India
 Miagrammopes gravelyi Tikader, 1971 Comments: Endemic to India
 Miagrammopes indicus Tikader, 1971 Synonym: Miagrammopes indica Tikader, 1971 Endemic to India.
 Miagrammopes kirkeensis Tikader, 1971 Comments: Endemic to India
 Miagrammopes poonaensis Tikader, 1971 Comments: Endemic to India
 Miagrammopes sexpunctatus Simon, 1906 Comments: Endemic to India
 Miagrammopes sutherlandi Tikader, 1971 Comments: Endemic to India
 Miagrammopes thwaitesi O.P.-Cambridge, 1870 Distribution: India, Sri Lanka Endemic to South Asia
LVIII.c. Genus Philoponella Mello-Leitão, 1917 
 Philoponella hilaris (Simon, 1906) Comments: Endemic to India.
LVIII.d. Genus Uloborus Latreille, 1806
 Uloborus bigibbosus Simon, 1905 Comments: Endemic to India
 Uloborus danolius Tikader, 1969 Comments: Endemic to India
 Uloborus ferokus Bradoo, 1979 Comments: Endemic to India
 Uloborus filifaciens Hingston, 1927 Comments: Endemic to Andaman & Nicobar Islands
 Uloborus furunculus Simon, 1906 Comments: Endemic to India
 Uloborus jabalpurensis Bhandari & Gajbe, 2001 Comments: Endemic to India
 Uloborus khasiensis Tikader, 1969 Comments: Endemic to India
 Uloborus krishnae Tikader, 1970 Comments: Endemic to India
 Uloborus modestus Thorell, 1891 Comments: Endemic to Andaman & Nicobar Islands
LVIII.e.  Genus Zosis Walckenaer, 1842
 Zosis geniculata (Olivier, 1789) Distribution: Pantropical

LIX. Family Zodariidae Thorell, 1881
LIX.a. Genus Asceua Thorell, 1887 
 Asceua cingulata (Simon, 1905) Synonym: Suffucia cingulata Simon, 1905 Comments: Endemic to India
LIX.b. Genus Capheris Simon, 1893
 Capheris escheri Reimoser, 1934 Comments: Endemic to India
 Capheris nitidiceps Simon, 1905 Comments: Endemic to India
 Capheris stillata Simon, 1905 Comments: Endemic to India
LIX.c. Genus Hermippus Simon, 1893 
 Hermippus arjuna (Gravely, 1921) Synonym: Hermippoides arjuna Gravely, 1921 Comments: Endemic to India
 Hermippus cruciatus Simon, 1905 Distribution: India, Sri Lanka Comments: Endemic to South Asia
LIX.d. Genus Lutica Marx, 1891 Comments: According to Platnick all Indian species are misplaced.
 Lutica bengalensis Tikader & Patel, 1975 Comments: Endemic to India
 Lutica deccanensis Tikader & Malhotra, 1976 Comments: Endemic to India
 Lutica kovvurensis Reddy & Patel, 1993 Comments: Endemic to India
 Lutica poonaensis Tikader, 1981 Comments: Endemic to India
LIX.e. Genus Storena Walckenaer, 1805 
 Storena arakuensis Patel & Reddy, 1989 Comments: Endemic to India
 Storena birenifer Gravely, 1921 Comments: Endemic to India
 Storena debasrae Biswas & Biswas, 1992 Comments: Endemic to India
 Storena gujaratensis Tikader & Patel, 1975 Comments: Endemic to India
 Storena indica Tikader & Patel, 1975 Comments: Endemic to India
 Storena nilgherina Simon, 1906 Comments: Endemic to India
 Storena redimita Simon, 1905 Comments: Endemic to India
 Storena tikaderi Patel & Reddy, 1989 Comments: Endemic to India
LIX.f. Genus Storenomorpha Simon, 1884 
 Storenomorpha joyaus (Tikader, 1970) Comments: Endemic to India.
LIX.g. Genus Suffasia Jocqué, 1991 Comments: Endemic to South Asia.
 Suffasia tigrina (Simon, 1893) Comments: Endemic to India.

References

 
India
Spiders
India